= History of the Romanian language =

The history of the Romanian language started in Roman provinces north of the Jireček Line in Classical antiquity. There are three main hypotheses around its exact territory: the autochthony thesis (it developed in left-Danube Dacia only), the discontinuation thesis (it developed in right-Danube provinces only), and the "as-well-as" thesis that supports the language development on both sides of the Danube. Between the 6th and 8th centuries AD, following the accumulated tendencies inherited from the vernacular Latin and, to a much smaller degree, the influences from an unidentified substratum, and in the context of a lessened power of the Roman central authority, the language evolved into Common Romanian. This proto-language then came into close contact with the Slavic languages and subsequently divided into Aromanian, Megleno-Romanian, Istro-Romanian, and Daco-Romanian. Because of limited attestations between the 6th and 16th centuries, entire stages from its history are reconstructed by researchers, often with proposed relative chronologies and loose limits.

== Background ==
A number of Romance languages were once spoken in Southeastern Europe for centuries, but the Dalmatian branch disappeared centuries ago. Although the surviving Eastern group of Eastern Romance has in the meantime split into four major languages, their common features show that all of them originated from the same proto-language. Romanian, the largest among these languages, is spoken by more than 20 million people, primarily in Romania and Moldova. Aromanian has about 350,000 speakers who mainly live in the mountainous zones of Albania, Greece, and Macedonia. Some thousand people from the wider region of Thessaloniki speak the third language, which is known as Megleno-Romanian. The smallest Eastern Romance language, Istro-Romanian, is used by fewer than 1,500 speakers in Istria.

== External history ==
=== Substratum ===
Little is known of the substratum language but it is generally assumed to be an Indo-European language related to Albanian. Some linguists like Kim Schulte and Grigore Brâncuș use the phrase "Thraco-Dacian" for the substratum of Romanian, while others like Herbert J. Izzo and Vékony argue that the Eastern Romance languages developed on an Illyrian substrate. However, the small number of known Dacian, Illyrian or Thracian words excludes the systematic comparison of these idioms either with each other or with other languages. Dacian is represented by about a hundred plant names, 43 names of towns in Dacia as recorded by Ptolemy and around 1150 Dacian anthroponyms and 900 toponyms that have been preserved in ancient sources. The number of known Thracian or Illyrian words – mainly glosses, place names and personal names – is even smaller.

Estimates of the number of Romanian words of substratum origin range between about 90 and 140. At least 70 of these words (Note: For instance, Romanian abur and Albanian avull ("steam, vapor") , (Orel 1998, p. 12.), Romanian grumaz ("neck") and Albanian gurmaz ("gullet") (Orel 1998, pp. 127-128.), Romanian ceafă and Albanian qafë ("neck") (Orel 1998, p. 353.), and Romanian vatră and Albanian vatër or votër ("hearth, fireplace") (Orel 1998, pp. 495-496.).) have Albanian cognates, which may indicate that the Romanian's substrate language is closely related to Albanian or perhaps even Albanian's direct ancestor. However, borrowings from Albanian to Romanian cannot be excluded either. The linguists Gottfried Schramm, and István Schütz even propose that they were borrowed in several phases. In contrast, the linguist Grigore Brâncuș says that these are in fact substratum words in Romanian from Thraco-Dacian as evident in the rhotacism of intervocalic -l- in the pair Alb. vjedhullë - Rom. viezure for example, or the evolution of "dz" in words like bardzu typical of Latin to Romanian development. In general the argument that these are loanwords, based on the reason they are derivative forms in Albanian and only show as isolates in Romanian, is disproved by similarity of the Romanian word to Proto-Albanian, the language spoken before the 6th or 7th century. For example, the Albanian word sorrë (crow) shows the change from ⟨t͡ʃ⟩ to s in Late Proto-Albanian, while Romanian has retained the old form cioară pronounced /ˈt͡ʃo̯a.rə/.

The largest semantic field (46 out the 89 considered certain to be of substratum) is formed by words describing nature: terrain, flora and fauna, and about 30% of these words with Albanian cognate (Note: Including, Romanian bască and Albanian bashkë ("fleece") (Orel 1998, p. 19.), Romanian țap and Albanian cjap ("he-goat") (Orel 1998, p. 47.), Romanian daș and Albanian dash ("ram") (Orel 1998, p. 57.), Romanian zară and Albanian dhallë or dhalltë ("buttermilk") (Orel 1998, p. 80.), Romanian gălbează and Albanian gëlbazë ("Fasciolosis") (Orel 1998, pp. 112-113.), and Romanian țark and Albanian thark ("enclosure for milking") (Orel 1998, p. 472.).) are connected to pastoral life. The proportion of words with Albanian cognates are found in the semantic fields of the physical world (Note: Including, Romanian mal ("bank, shore") and Albanian mal ("mountain") (Orel 1998, p. 243.; Schulte 2009, p. 252.), and Romanian pârâu and Albanian përrua or përrue ("brook, river-bed") (Orel 1998, p. 323.; Schulte 2009, p. 252.).) (4.8%), kinship (Note: For instance, Romanian copil ("child") and Albanian kopil ("lad, chap, bastard") (Orel 1998, p. 190.; Schulte 2009, p. 252.), and Romanian moș ("grandfather, old man") and Albanian moshë ("age") (Orel 1998, p. 274.; Schulte 2009, p. 252.).) (3.2%), agriculture and vegetation (Note: For instance, Romanian brad and Albanian bredh ("Fir tree") (Orel 1998, p. 34.; Schulte 2009, p. 252.).) (2.8%), and animals (Note: Including, Romanian căpușă and Albanian këpushë ("Tick") (Orel 1998, p. 179.; Schulte 2009, p. 252.), and Romanian mânz and Albanian mëz or mâz ("foal") (Orel 1998, p. 265.; Schulte 2009, p. 252.).) (2.7%).

Schütz argues that a number of Romanian words which are traditionally supposed to have been derived from hypothetical Vulgar Latin terms (Note: For instance, Schütz suggests that the Romanian word a spăla ("to rinse") was borrowed from Albanian shpëlaj ("to rinse") instead of originating from a hypotethical Vulgar Latin *expellavare (<*ex+per+lavare) (Schütz 2002, pp. 16-17.).) are in fact Albanian loanwords. Even Romanian words of Latin (Note: For instance, Romanian sat ("village") < Albanian fshat("village") < Latin fossātum ("ditch") (Schramm 1997, p. 312; Orel 1998, p. 104.).) or Slavic (Note: For instance, Romanian gata ("ready") < Albanian gatuaj or gatuej ("make ready") < Common Slavic *gotovati or *gotoviti ("make ready") (Schramm 1997, p. 320; Orel 1998, p. 111.).) origin seem to have been borrowed through Albanian mediation. Parallel changes in the meaning of a number of Latin words in the Albanian and the Romanian languages (Note: For instance, Romanian pădure and Albanian pyll ("forest") < Vulgar Latin *padūlem("forest") < Latin palūdem ("swamp") (Schramm 1997, p. 312; Orel 1998, p. 353.; Schütz 2002, p. 13.); Romanian drac and Albanian dreq ("devil") < dracō ("dragon") (Schramm 1997, p. 312; Orel 1998, p. 353.); Romanian femeie ("women, wife") and Albanian fëmijë ("child, family, spouse") < Latin famīlia ("family") (Orel 1998, p. 95.; Schütz 2002, pp. 12-13.).) can also be illustrated. A number of Albanian–Romanian calques (Note: For instance, both the Albanian and Romanian terms for "first" derived from words with a meaning "before": Albanian parë from Albanian para,(Orel 1998, p. 311.) and Romanian întii from Latin āntāneus (Schramm 1997, p. 313.).) exist.

The common morphological and syntactic features of Romanian with Albanian, Bulgarian, and other languages spoken in Southeastern Europe (Note: For instance, the merger of dative and genitive cases, and the use of auxiliary verbs with a meaning "will, want" to form the future tense are listed among the features shared by these languages (Mišeska Tomić 2006, pp. 26-27.).) can be attributed to a common substratum. However, this hypothesis cannot be proven, because of modern scholars' limited knowledge of the native idioms spoken in the region. Accordingly, it is also possible that these common features are to be attributed to parallel developments in all languages. According to the linguist Rebecca Posner, it is not impossible that the existence of the close central unrounded vowel of Romanian – which is marked by the letters "î" or "â" – can also be traced back to the pre-Latin substratum, but she adds that "there is little evidence to support this hypothesis".

=== Romanization and Vulgar Latin ===
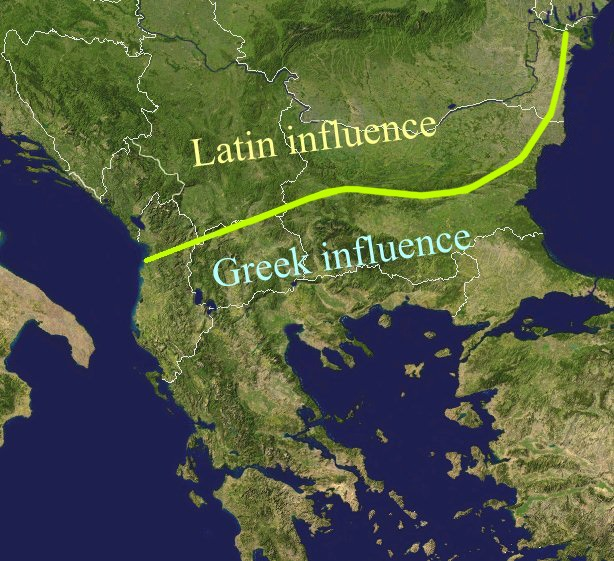
Jireček Line, a theoretical line separating the areas featured primarily by Latin inscriptions from lands where Greek was the dominant language of memorials in the Roman Empire. Romanian is almost exclusively spoken in territories that were never or for less than 180 years under Roman rule. Macedo-Romanian and Megleno-Romanian are spoken in the lands to the south of the Line.

The integration of Southeastern European territories into the Roman Empire began with the establishment of the province of Illyricum on the Adriatic coast around 60 BC. The Dalmatian language which occupied an intermediary position between Romanian and Italian started to develop in these coastal regions. The Roman expansion towards the Danube continued in the 1st century AD. New provinces were established, including Pannonia in 9 AD, Moesia under Emperor Claudius (r. 41–54), and Roman Dacia in 106. The presence of legions and auxiliary troops ensured the Romans' control over the natives. The establishment of colonies also contributed to the consolidation of Roman rule. Accordingly, a relatively peaceful period which lasted till the end of the 2nd century followed everywhere the conquest. This Pax Romana was instrumental in the "standardization of language, customs, architecture, housing and technology". Even so, St Jerome and later authors evidence that Illyrian and other native tongues survived at least up until the late 4th century.

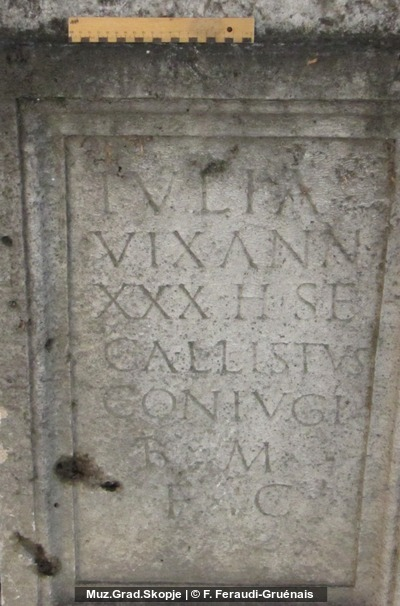
Latin inscription from Skopje, North Macedonia. According to one of the main theories on the origin of Romanian, it was preceded by Vulgar Latin spoken south of the Danube.

Latin's literary register and its spoken vernacular, now known as "Classical Latin" and "Vulgar Latin" respectively, started to diverge by the time of the Roman conquest of Southeastern Europe. Accordingly, the Roman colonists introduced these popular forms when they settled in the newly conquered provinces. Inscriptions from the Roman period evidence that the Latin tongue of Southeastern Europe developed in line with the evolution of the language in the empire's other parts at least until the end of the 3rd century. Likewise, a number of inherited Romanian words testify to the fact that the Latin variety from which they emerged underwent the changes affecting the phonemes, lexicon, and other features of the Latin in the same period. For instance, the merger of the close e and open i vowels into a close "e" can be demonstrated (Note: For instance, Romanian măiestru < Vulgar Latin maester < Classical Latin magister 'master' (Vékony 2000, p. 180.)) through inherited Romanian words, and many items of Romanian vocabulary had its origin in popular terms (Note: For instance, the Romanian word for horse, cal, stems from caballus 'nag' instead of the Classical Latin equus 'horse' (Alkire & Rosen 2010, pp=287-288.).) instead of literary forms.

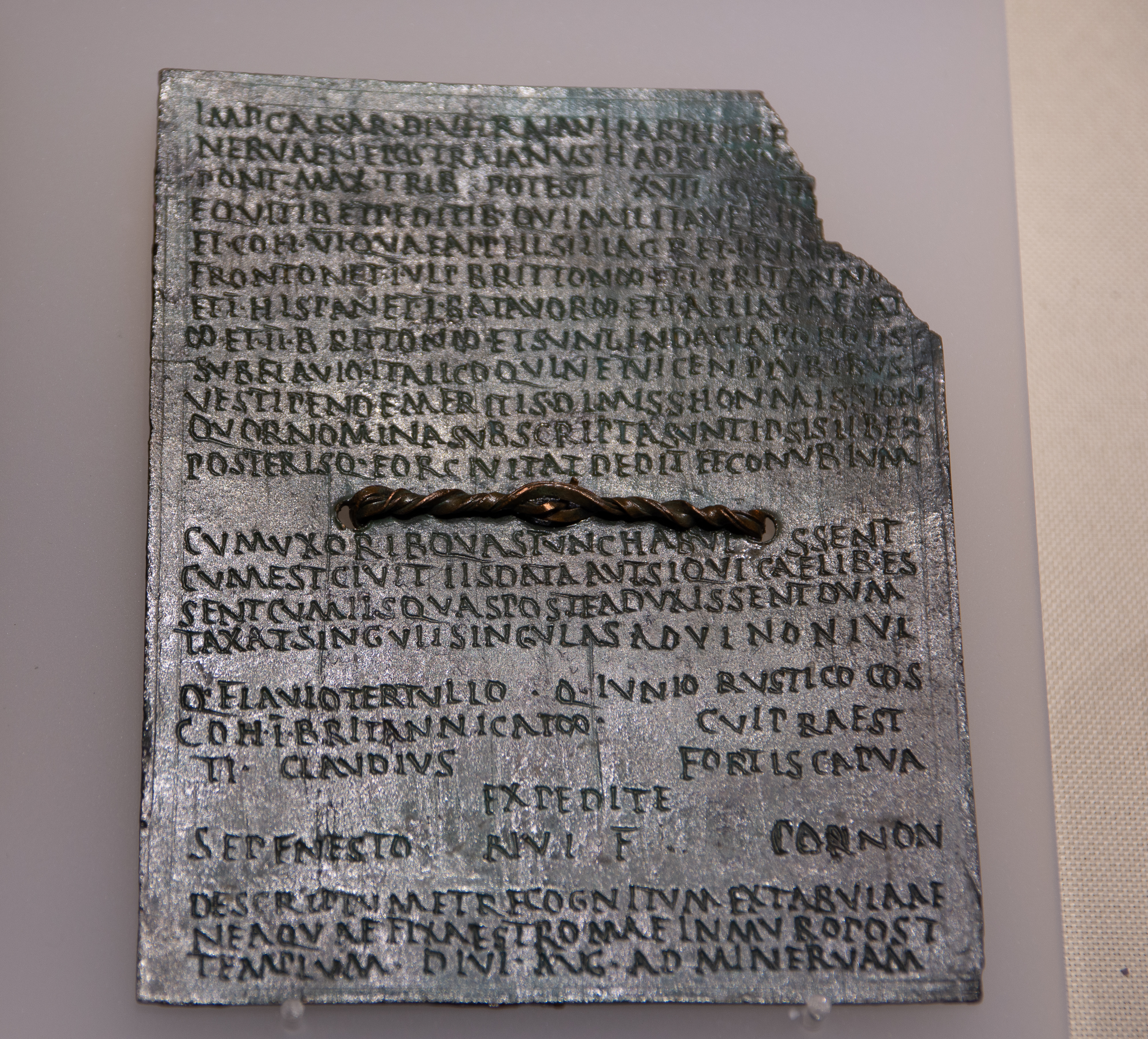
Latin military diploma from Gherla, Romania. According to one of the main theories on the origin of Romanian, it was preceded by Vulgar Latin spoken in Dacia.

Trajan's Dacia to the north of the Lower Danube was abandoned in the early 270s. Those who left these territories were settled to the south of the river where a new province bearing the same name, Aurelian's Dacia was carved out of Moesia. However, some written sources refer to the use of Latin in the territories to the north of the Lower Danube up until the 6th century. Priscus of Panium's report of his visit in the court of Attila the Hun in 448 evidence that all "subjects of the Huns" who had "commercial dealings with" the Western Roman Empire spoke Latin, "but none of them easily" spoke Greek. He also met Rusticius from Moesia who acted as interpreter, Constantiolus, "a man from the Pannonian territory", and "Zerkon, the Moorish dwarf" whose words "were a confused jumble of Latin, Hunnic, and Gothic". A century later Procopius of Caesarea wrote of a prisoner of war who "was by birth of the Antae", but who "spoke in the Latin tongue"

The Goths and other neighboring tribes made frequent raids against the Roman territories in the decades following the Romans' withdrawal from Trajan's Dacia, but the Emperors Diocletian (r. 284–305) and Constantine the Great (r. 324–337) consolidated the empire's frontiers. The empire was officially divided into two parts in 395, but Latin remained one of the two official languages of the Eastern Roman Empire up to the early 7th century. For instance, when Leo II was proclaimed emperor in Constantinople in 474, his armies hailed him in Latin. Emperor Justinian I (r. 527–565) who was born in Dardania even stated that Latin was his native language (paternus sermo). Eastern Roman rule in the Balkan Peninsula collapsed under Emperor Heraclius (r. 610–641).

Inscriptions and literary sources evidence that Latin remained the predominant language of communication in the provinces along the Danube throughout the 4th and 6th centuries. For the same reason, Justinian's Novels were published in Latin for these provinces. The last Latin inscriptions in the region are dated to the 610s. Gábor Vékony argues that some place names recorded in The Buildings of Justinian by Procopius of Caesarea show vowel shifts which characterize the development of Romanian. For instance, the featuring shift from "o" to "u" seems to be reflected in the name of Scumbro – a fortress in the region of Remesiana (now Bela Palanka, Serbia) – which cannot be independent of the ancient Scombrus mons name of the Vitosha Mountains. The major hydronymy North of the Danube is inherited from Thraco-Dacian, but with one exception, the Romanian name of these rivers is not in line with the phonetical evolution of Romanian from Latin. Theophylact Simocatta and Theophanes the Confessor recorded the first words – torna, torna fratre ("turn, turn brother") or torna, torna ("turn, turn") – which may be attributed to the Romanian language. These words were shouted by a soldier from the region between the Haemus Mountains and the Upper Thracian Plain "in his native tongue" during an Eastern Roman campaign of 587.

Ovid Densusianu wrote, already in 1901, of a Vulgar Latin which "lost its unity, breaking into languages that developed into today's Romance languages. For instance, the sonorization of the voiceless consonants between vowels (Note: For instance, Romanian freca, Dalmatian frekur from Latin fricare, in contrast to French frayer, Spanish and Portuguese fregar, and Italian fregare (Mihăescu 1993, p. 156.).) which can be demonstrated during the formation of the Western Romance languages cannot be detected in the evolution of the Eastern Romance and Dalmatian languages. In many cases, Romanian share common features with Italian, (Note: Including the change of "s" at the end of words into "i" in Italian and Romanian words: Italian and Romanian trei from Latin tres, and Italian and Romanian noi from Latin nos (Nandriș 1951, p. 21.).) Romansh and Dalmatian (Note: For instance, the development of the consonant clusters "ct", "cs" and "gn" into "pt", "ps" and "mn": Romanian opt and Dalmatian guapto from Latin octo, Romanian coapsă and Vegliot kopsa from Latin coxa, and Romanian cumnat and Ragusan comnut from Latin cognatus (Nandriș 1951, p. 21.).) languages. Nandriș argues that these common features suggest that "for some time the development of Carpatho-Balkan Latin" (that is of old Romanian) "moved along the same lines as the Latin of the Adriatic coast and that of the Alps and of South-Eastern Italy." On the other hand, he argues that the similar features of the Romanian and Sardinian languages (Note: For instance, the development of the "gua" cluster into "ba" in both languages as it is demonstrated by Romanian limbă and Sardinian limba which developed from Latin lingua (Nandriș 1951, p. 21.).) "are explained by the principle of peripheral areas in dialectal development". According to Gabor Vékony the Latin variety from which Romanian developed shows the traits of many changes of the Latin which occurred in the 4th and 6th centuries. According to Haralambie Mihăescu these changes cannot always be detected in all Romance languages which suggests that the Latin language underwent a process of regional differentiation in this period.

=== Common Romanian ===
Chart of Romance languages based on structural and comparative criteria, not on socio-functional ones. FP: Franco-Provençal, IR: Istro-Romanian.

Romanian linguist Ovid Densusianu coined the term "Thraco-Roman" in 1901 to describe the "oldest epoch of the creation of the Romanian language", when the Vulgar Latin between the 4th and 6th centuries, having its own peculiarities, had evolved into what is known as Proto-Romanian. Estimates of the ratio of Romanian words directly inherited from Latin is around 20% The proportion of words of Latin origin is especially high in the semantic fields of sense perception (Note: For instance, Romanian vedea, Aromanian, Megleno-Romanian ved, Istro-Romanian vedę < Latin videre 'to see'; Romanian asculta, Aromanian ascultu, Megleno-Romanian scult, Istro-Romanian scutå < Latin ascultare 'to listen'; Romanian dulce, Aromanian dulțe, Megleno-Romanian dulți, Istro-Romanian dul'če < Latin dulcis 'sweet' (Mihăescu 1993, pp. 227-228.).) (86.1%), quantity (Note: Including, Romanian and Megleno-Romanian mult, Aromanian multu, Istro-Romanian munt, mund < Latin multus 'much or many'; Romanian, Aromanian, Megleno-Romanian singur < Latin singulus 'single, only';(Mihăescu 1993, p. 184.) and Romanian, Aromanian, Megleno-Romanian patru < Latin quattour 'four' (Mišeska Tomić 2006, p. 663; Mallinson 1998, p. 404).) (82.3%), kinship (Note: For instance, Romanian and Aromanian frate, Megleno-Romanian frati and Istro-Romanian fråte from Latin frater 'brother', Romanian, Aromanian, and Megleno-Romanian soră or sor, and Istro-Romanian sora from Latin soror 'sister', and Romanian unchi from Latin avunculus 'uncle' (Mihăescu 1993, pp. 272-273.).) (76.9%), and time (Note: Including Romanian and Megleno-Romanian timp < Latin tempus 'time', Romanian primăvară, Aromanian, Megleno-Romanian primăveară, Istro-Romanian primavera < Latin primavera; Romanian and Istro-Romanian zi, Aromanian dzî or dzuuă, and Megleno-Romanian zuuă < Latin dies 'day'; Romanian, Megleno-Romanian nou, Aromanian nou, nău, Istro-Romanian now, nou < Latin novus 'new' (Mihăescu 1993, pp. 183-184.).) (74.7%). More than 90% of the function words, 80% of the adverbs and 68% of the adjectives in the Romanian language were directly inherited from Latin.

Some Latin terms connected to an urbanized society survived by being adapted to rural environment, for example pământ from pavimentum, and the vocabulary for navigation, higher religious organization, and education was considerably reduced. Inherited Romanian words for "road" also reveal that the life of the Romanians' ancestors became more rural after the collapse of Roman civilization. For instance, the Latin word for bridge pons developed into Romanian punte which refers to a tree trunk placed over a ditch or a ravine, while the Romanian word for road cale developed from Latin callis 'a narrow footpath, a track'. Grigore Nandriș emphasizes that Romanian "terms for «to move from one place to another» (Note: For instance, the Latin term for "to fold" plicare developed into Romanian a pleca 'to go; wander', and Romanian a se duce 'to go', but a duce 'to lead' comes from Latin ducere 'to lead'(Nandriș 1951, p. 12.).) seem to be particularly numerous". Likewise, Romanian verbs referring to "going" (Note: For instance, Romanian a lua ("to take the road") from Latin levare ("to lift") lua, Romanian a urla 'to howl, to go down in the valley' from Latin ululare 'to howl' urla, and Romanian a merge 'to go' from Latin mergere 'to dive' merge (Nandriș 1951, pp. 12-13.).) developed from Latin verbs with a different meaning.

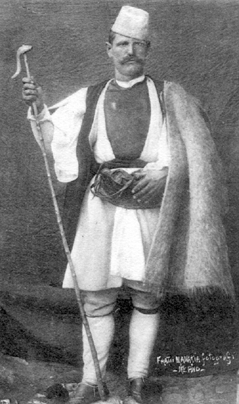
Vlach shepherd in his traditional clothes

Based on a study of inherited Latin words and loanwords in the Romanian language, Nandriș, Schramm, Vékony and other scholars conclude that the Romanians stemmed from a population who inhabited the mountainous zones of Southeastern Europe and were primarily engaged in animal husbandry. For instance, Schramm emphasizes that "the Romanians inherited the word for «to plow» from Latin, but borrowed both the names of the parts of the plough [...] and the terminology of the intricacies of plowing techniques from Slavic" which suggests that their ancestors only preserved some very basic knowledge of cultivation of plants. However, as linguist Marius Sala says, the Slavic terms entered Romanian language by designating improved tools compared to the ones used by the Daco-Roman population, replacing the old words inherited from Latin. The old word for plough has been inherited in Aromanian as "arat" from the Latin "arātrum" while the improved tool took the Slavic name in Romanian dialects. Other scholars, including historian Victor Spinei, state that the great number of names of crops (Note: For instance, Romanian grâu, Aromanian grănu, and Megleno-Romanian gron 'wheat' < Latin granum 'grain, seed'; Romanian secară, Aromanian and Megleno-Romanian sicară, Istro-Romanian secåre < Vulgar Latin secale 'rye'; Romanian and Istro-Romanian orz, Aromanian ordzu, Megleno-Romanian uarz < Latin hordeum 'barley'; and Romanian mei, Aromanian mel'u, Megleno-Romanian and Istro-Romanian mel' < Latin milium 'millet' (Mihăescu 1993, pp. 256-257.; Spinei 2009, p. 224).) and agricultural techniques (Note: For instance, Romanian ara, Aromanian and Megleno-Romanian arare and Istro-Romanian arå < Latin arare 'to plow' (Mihăescu 1993, p. 261.; Spinei 2009, p. 224).) directly inherited from Latin indicates "a very long continuity of agricultural practices". Grigore Brâncuș adds to this list that the majority of pomiculture, numerous apicultural, and all the swineherding terms complete a view of a mixed farming society involved in both the growing of crops and the raising of livestock.

Like only a few other Romance languages, Romanian has preserved the Romanus endonym. Its rumân variant – which referred to serfs – was first recorded in the first half of the sixteenth century, while its român variant is documented in second half. However, other peoples referred to the Romanians as Vlach throughout the Middle Ages. This exonym and its variants (Note: Including Byzantine Greek βλάχοϛ, Hungarian oláh, and Polish wołoch (Mihăescu 1993, p. 155.).) stemmed from a reconstructed Germanic word *walhaz, by which the ancient Germans initially referred specifically to the Celts, then to the Romanized Celts, and finally to all Romance-speakers. It was adopted by the Slavs and from them the Greeks.

Historians have not reached a consensus on the date of the first historical event which can, without doubt, connect to Romanians. The Romanian historian Ioan-Aurel Pop makes mention of "written records" which refer to Romanians existing in the 8th and 9th centuries but does not name any of them. Vlad Georgescu cites a "ninth-century Armenian geography" which refers to an "unknown country called Balak", but Victor Spinei emphasizes that it is an interpolation "probably from the first centuries of the second millennium". Spinei himself suggests that the first recorded events of the Romanians' history are connected to their fights against the Hungarians in territories to the north of the Danube around 895. In this respect, he cites the Primary Chronicle from the 1120s and the late 13th-century Gesta Hungarorum. However, the idea that the Primary Chronicle refers to Romanians has not been universally accepted. Likewise, specialists have often questioned the reliability of the Gesta Hungarorum. All the same, it is without doubt that especially Vlachs of the Balkan Peninsula are mentioned by Byzantine sources in connection with events of the late 10th century. Spinei and Georgescu propose that the Blakumen of a Varangian runestone from around 1050 are the first Romanians whose presence in the lands east of the Carpathians was recorded.

=== Slavic adstratum ===
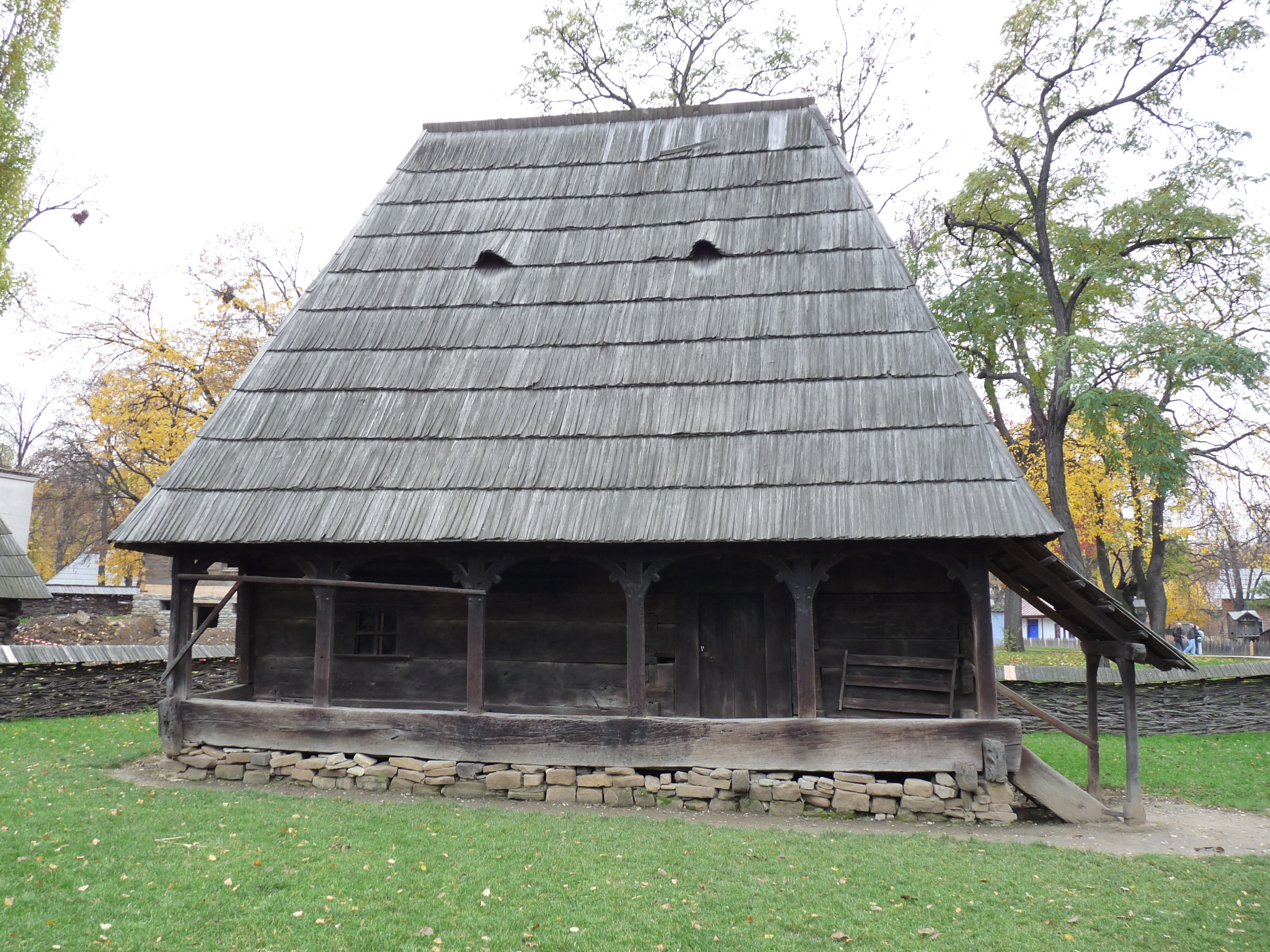
A traditional house built in Berbești in 1775 (Dimitrie Gusti National Village Museum in Bucharest)

Huge territories to the north of the Lower Danube were dominated by Goths and Gepids for at least 300 years from the 270s, but no Romanian words of East Germanic origin have so far been detected. On the other hand, Slavic influence on Romanian was much stronger than Germanic influence on French, Italian, Spanish and other Western Romance languages. Although "a number of Slavic loanwords have fallen victim to a strong re-latinisation process since the 19th century", (Note: For instance, the (Schulte 2009, p. 244.).) the proportion of Slavic loanwords is still around 15%. The ratio of Slavic loanwords is especially high in the semantic fields of house (Note: Including, perie ("brush"), colibă ("hut"), ogradă ("yard, court"), stâlp ("doorpost", "post", "pole"), zâvor ("latch, doorbolt"), prag ("door, gate"), and cămin ("fireplace") (Schulte 2009, pp. 252-254.).) (26,5%), religion and belief (Note: For instance, a propovădui ("to preach"), a posti ("to fast"), iad ("hell"), and duh ("ghost") (Schulte 2009, pp. 252-254.).) (25%), basic actions and technology (Note: For instance, a clădi and a zidi ("to build"), a tăvăli ("to turn"), a stropi ("to splash"), daltă ("chisel"), and ciocan ("hammer") (Schulte 2009, pp. 252-254.).) (22,6%), social and political relations (Note: Including, a opri ("to forbid"), a porunci ("to command"), stăpân ("master"), rob ("slave"), prieten ("friend") (Schulte 2009, pp. 252-253.).) (22,5%), and agriculture and vegetation (Note: For instance, ovăz ("oats"), hârleț ("spade"), lopată ("shovel"), a sădi ("to sow"), a cosi ("to mow"), and brazdă ("furrow") (Schulte 2009, pp. 252-253.).) (22,5%). About 20% of the Romanian adverbs, nearly 17% of the nouns, and around 14% of the verbs are of Slavic origin. Slavic loanwords often coexist with a synonym inherited from Latin which sometimes give rise to semantic differentiation. For instance, both inherited "timp" and the Slavic loanword "vreme" may refer to either time or weather, but nowadays "vreme" is preferred in meteorological context. Loanwords borrowed from Slavic often have an emotional (Note: Including, dragă ("dear"), slab ("weak"), boală ("sickness") (Hall 1974, pp. 91-92.).) context, and they represent a positive (Note: For instance, the Slavic loanword a iubi ("to love") and inherited a urî("to hate"), or the inherited nu ("not") and the borrowed da ("yes") (Schulte 2009, p. 244.).) connotation in many cases. Many linguists – including Günther Reichenkron and Robert A. Hall – argue that these features of the Slavic loanwords point at the one-time existence of bilingual communities with many Slavic speakers adopting Romanian, but their view have not been universally accepted.

The earliest stratum of Slavic loanwords – which is now represented by around 80 terms – was adopted in the Common Slavic period which ended around 850. However, the majority of Romanian words of Slavic origin was only adopted after the metathesis of the Common Slavic *tort-formula – which was "a specific type of syllable whereby t stands for any consonant, o for either e or o, and r for both r and l" – had been completed. Old Church Slavonic terms also enriched the Romanians' religious vocabulary in this period. Proto-Romanian even adopted words of Latin (Note: For instance, oțet 'vinegar', oțel 'steel', colinde 'Christmas carols' (Mihăescu 1993, p. 479.).) or Greek (Note: Including, chilie 'cell', psaltire 'psalter', and călugăr 'monk' (Mallinson 1998, p. 414.).) origin through Slavic mediation in this period. Romanian and Istro-Romanian separated from the southern dialects in the 10th century, but retained a significant number of common Slavic loanwords. Each Eastern Romance language and its dialects adopted loanwords from the neighboring Slavic peoples thereafter. For instance, Ukrainian and Russian influenced the northern Romanian dialects, while Croatian influenced Istro-Romanian.

In addition to vocabulary, Slavic languages also had effects on Eastern Romance phonology and morphology, although their extent is debated by specialists. The iotation of e in word-initial position in some basic words (Note: For instance, eu 'I' is pronounced as [yew] and ești 'you are' as [yest] (Petrucci 1999, p. 50.).) – that is the appearance of a semi vowel j before e in these terms – is one of the Romanian phonological features with a debated origin. Peter R. Petrucci argues that it was the consequence of a language shift from Common Slavic to Eastern Romance, while Grigore Nandriș emphasizes that "Latin e was diphthongised at an early period not only in" Romanian "but also in most Romance languages". The formation of numerals between eleven and nineteen clearly follow Slavic pattern – for instance, unsprezece "one-on-ten", doisprezece "two-on-ten", and nouăsprezece "nine-on-ten" – which also indicates that a significant number of originally Slavic-speaking people once adopted Romanian.

=== Pre-literary Romanian ===
The period between the 10th century, when the northern dialects of Common Romanian separate from the southern ones, up to the early known writings in Romanian in the 16th century, is known as the pre-literary stage of the language.

Characteristics of this period are the emergence of [ɨ] vowel, dropping of final [u], monophthongisation of ea diphthong from Common Romanian (ex: feată > fată), the influence of Old Church Slavonic, and the entry of Hungarian words in the vocabulary.

The Romanians' presence in the Kingdom of Hungary is proven by nearly contemporary sources from the beginning of the 13th century. The Pechenegs and the Cumans spoke Turkic languages, but the distinction of words borrowed from them and loanwords of Crimean Tatar or Ottoman Turkish origin is almost impossible. For instance, Lazăr Șăineanu proposes that the Romanian word for mace (buzdugan) stemmed from the Cumans or Pechenegs, but no maces dated to the period before around 1300 have been unearthed in the Pontic steppes. According to István Schütz, cioban – a Romanian word for shepherd which also exists in Albanian, Bulgarian and many other Slavic languages – can be of Pecheneg or Cuman origin. The cohabitation of Romanians and Hungarians caused that the former adopted a number of Hungarian words. The proportion of Hungarian loanwords is now about 1,6%. Their ratio is relatively high in the semantic fields of social and political relations (Note: For instance, gazdă ("host") , neam ("people") (Schulte 2009, p. 255.).) (6,5%), clothing and grooming (Note: For instance, cismă ("boot") , and bumb ("button") (Schulte 2009, p. 255.).) (4,5%), speech and language (Note: For instance, a făgădui ("to promise") , and a tăgădui ("to deny") (Schulte 2009, p. 255.).) (4,5%), and the house (Note: For instance, a locui ("to live") , and lacăt ("lock, padlock") (Schulte 2009, p. 255.).) (4,3%). Although most Hungarian loanwords have spread in all Romanian dialects, many of them are only used in Transylvania.

While some Eastern Romance languages and dialects adopted a number of loanwords in the course of their development, others remained more conservative. In this respect, the Wallachian dialect of Romanian is the most innovative of all Romanian dialects. Many linguists and historians – including Grigore Nandriș and Alexandru Madgearu – even propose that the preservation of inherited Latin words by the dialects spoken in Roman Dacia which were replaced by loanwords in other regions (Note: For instance, the Latin word for snow nivem was preserved in Western Transylvania as nea, but was replaced by Slavic loanwords (omăt and zăpada) in other regions (Nandriș 1951, p. 18.).) proves that these territories served as centres of "linguistic expansion". Likewise, the Maramureș dialect (Note: For instance, the Latin word for sand arena was preserved in Western Transylvania and Maramureș as arină, but was replaced by the Slavic loanword (nisip) in most other regions (Nandriș 1951, p. 18.).) has also preserved words of Latin origin which disappeared from most other dialects. On the other hand, Aromanian, although it is now spoken in regions where its development could not start still uses a number of inherited Latin terms instead of the loanwords (Note: For instance, similar to the Western Transylvanian dialect of Romanian, (Nandriș 1951, p. 18.) Aromanian preserves Aromanian: neao for snow and Aromanian: arină for sand (Mišeska Tomić 2006 p. 665.). Furthermore, for instance, the Aromanian word for plow Aromanian: arat was directly inherited from Latin aratru in contrast with Romanian plug which is a Slavic loanword (Mihăescu 1993, p. 177.).) which were adopted by other Eastern Romance languages.

=== Development of Literary Romanian ===
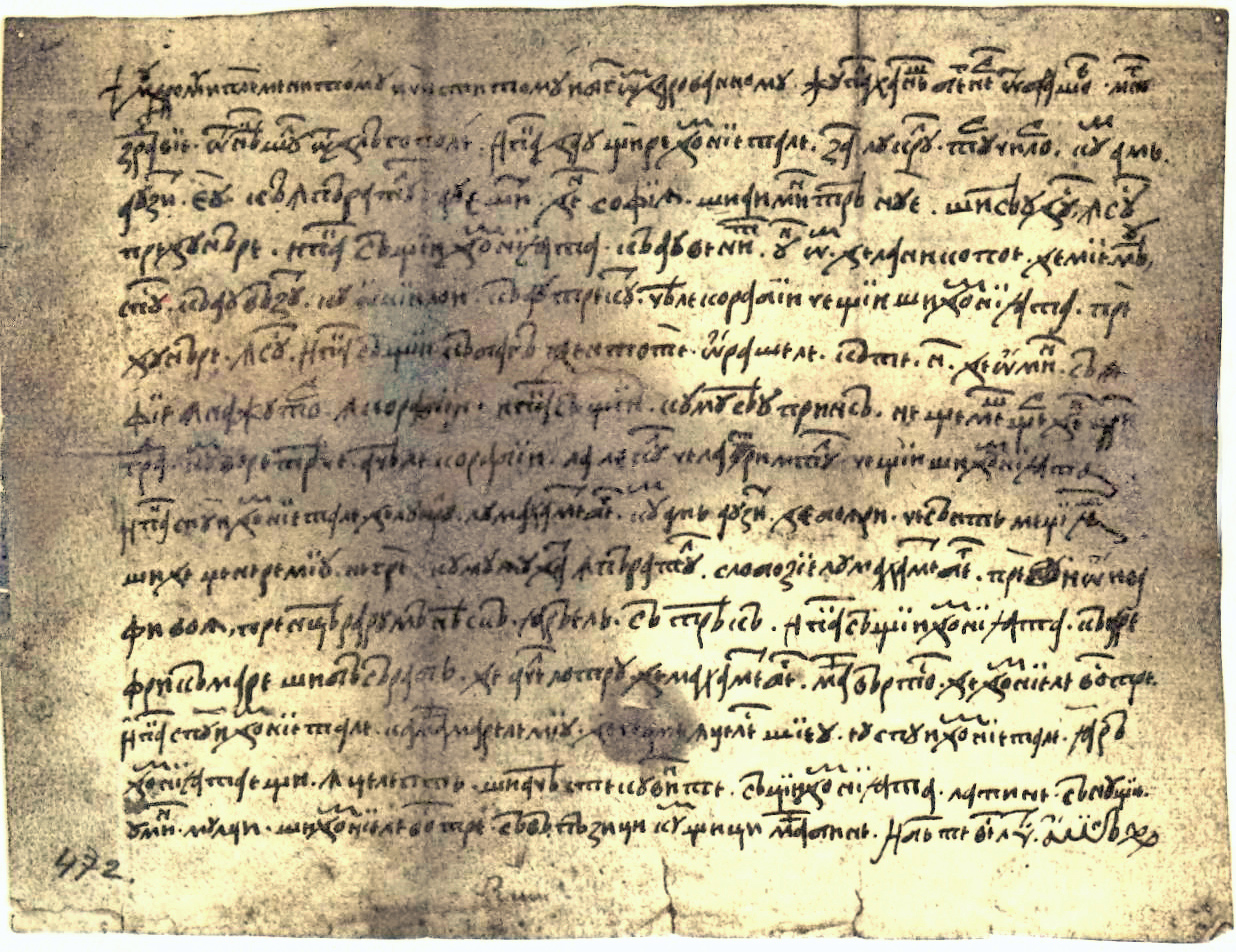
Neacșu's Letter from 1521, the oldest surviving document written in Romanian that can be precisely dated

The Hurmuzaki Psalter (Psaltirea Hurmuzaki) is the oldest writing in Romanian, dated on the basis of watermarks between 1491 and 1504. It is a copy of an older, fifteenth-century translation of the Byzantine Psalter, which was bilingual (written in Church Slavonic, with Romanian translation after each verse). The oldest surviving dated document in Romanian is a letter sent by Lupu Neacșu from the then Dlăgopole, now Câmpulung, Wallachia, to Johannes Benkner of Brașov, Transylvania. From the events and people mentioned in the letter it can be inferred that it was written around the 29th or 30 June 1521. The first decades of the 16th century (from when the first writings in Romanian appear) and 1780, the date of publication the Transylvanian School’s grammar Elementa linguae daco-romanae sive valachicae define the boundaries of Literary Romanian's development. This period is also traditionally called Old Romanian.

Among the first scholars to note the Latin character of the Romanian language were Italian humanists Poggio Bracciolini and Flavio Biondo. The Polish chronicler Jan Długosz remarked in 1476 that Moldavians and Wallachians "share a language and customs". During the 16th century the use of the endonym Romanian for the language and for the people was noted by a number of foreign scholars and chroniclers, such as Francesco della Valle, Tranquillo Andronico, the Transylvanian Szekler Johann Lebel, the Polish chronicler Stanislaw Orzechowski, the Croatian Ante Verančić, and Ferrante Capecci.

==== In Moldavia ====
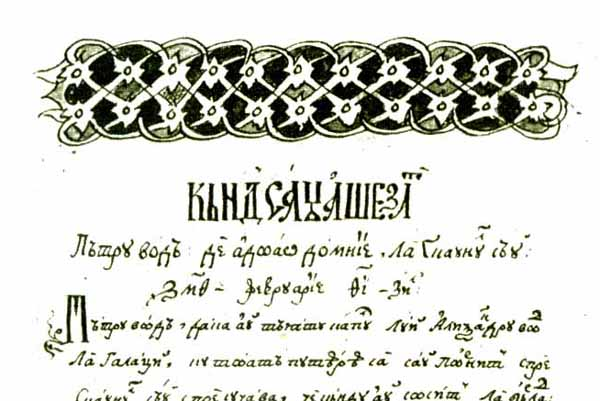
A page from Grigore Ureche's "Letopisețul Țării Moldovei" manuscript

The first full texts in Romanian appeared in Moldavia starting from the first decades of the 16th century. Four manuscripts, Hurmuzaki Psalter (Psaltirea Hurmuzaki) from the first half of the century and considered by most researchers a translation of an older text possibly from the region of Maramureș, and the three others: Codicele Voronețean, Psaltirea Voronețeană, and Psaltirea Scheiană dated more likely from the second half of the 16th century, are known as Rhotacizing Texts (showing rhotacism of intervocalic /n/).

The Moldavian chronicles started with a translation into Old Church Slavonic from a Byzantine chronicle tracing world happenings from Creation to A.D. 1081, written by Constantine Manasses of Navpaktos. The first contributions of Romanian authors (initially an anonymous chronicler, then Macarie, Eftimie, and Azarie) were in Old Church Slavonic as well, but from the time of the Moldavian nobleman Grigore Ureche (ca. 1590–1647) the chronicle was written in Romanian, narrating events related to Moldavian affairs from 1359 to 1594. The latter, in his The Chronicles of the land of Moldavia (Romanian Letopisețul Țării Moldovei) (1640s), talked about the language spoken by the Moldavians and considered it to be an amalgam of numerous languages (Latin, French, Greek, Polish, Turkish, Serbian, etc.) and mixed with the neighboring languages. Miron Costin continued Ureche's chronicle, adding events from 1595 to 1661. Like his predecessor, Costin was a nobleman (boyar) and supported the rightful rule of the prince (domnitor) with the advice and consent of the boyars. He narrated the short-lived unification of Wallachia, Transylvania, and Moldavia by the Wallachian prince Michael the Brave, but did so "somewhat perfunctorily". More enthusiastically he supported the idea of Roman origin of the Romanian people, being the first to suggest that Roman colonists in Dacia withdrew to the mountains during Middle Ages and later re-emerged in the fourteenth century. In his De neamul moldovenilor (1687) while noting that Moldavians, Wallachians, and the Romanians living in the Kingdom of Hungary have the same origin, he said that although people of Moldavia call themselves "Moldavians", they name their language "Romanian" (românește) instead of Moldavian (moldovenește). Nicolae Costin, departing from the "honeyed and metaphorical language" of Ureche or the "scholarly and talented discourse" of his father, Miron Costin, adopted a more pretentious and digressive style in his cover of events. Ion Neculce, a boyar from a Greek family, used a language more alike the vernacular spoken in the northern part of the Moldavia, "sweet and lively", adding events from 1661 to 1743.

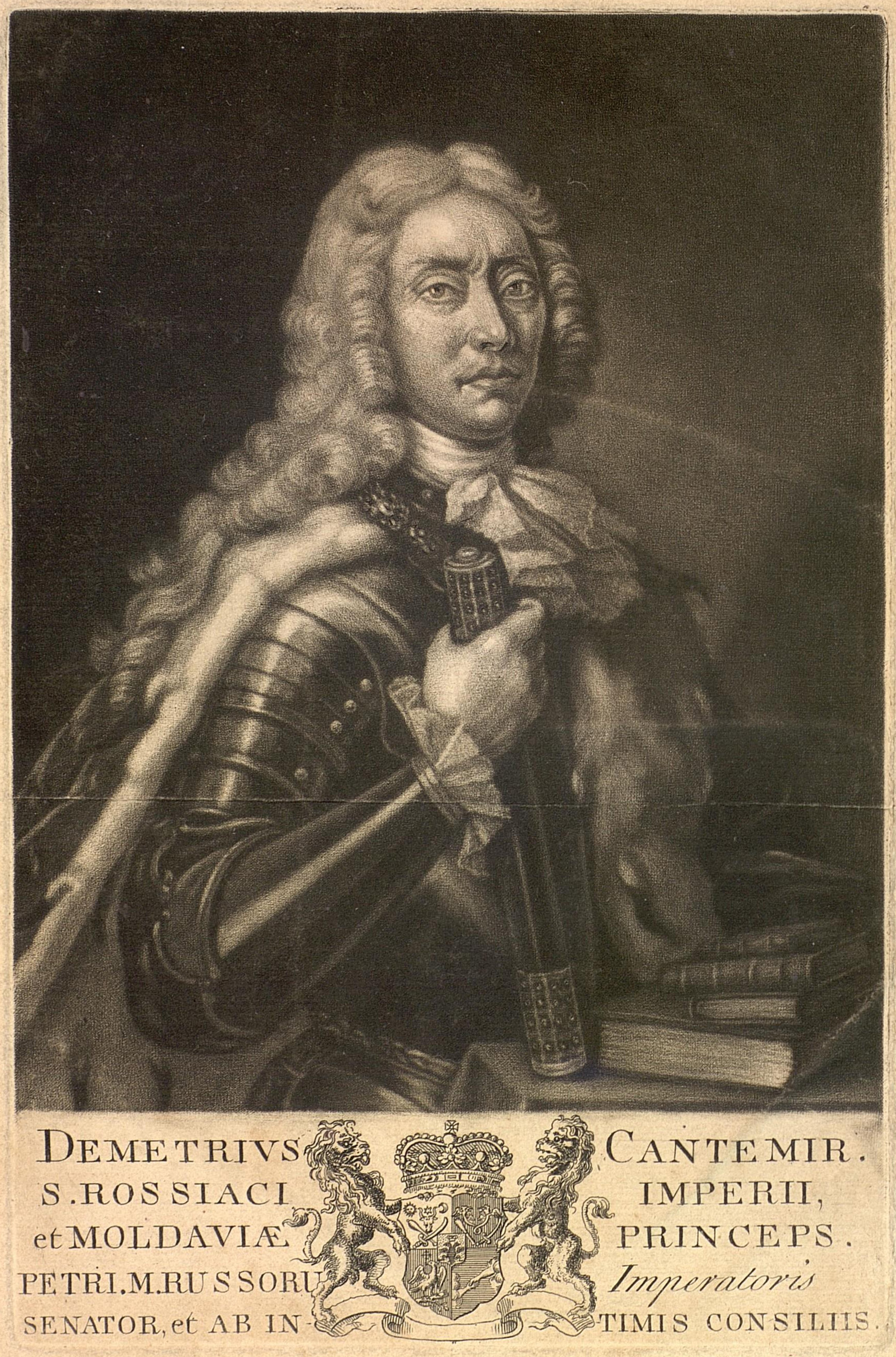
Dimitrie Cantemir - portrait from the 1734 translated edition of History of the Growth and Decay of the Ottoman Empire, London

Dimitrie Cantemir (26 October 1673 – 21 August 1723), prince of Moldavia and polymath, is considered the most influential writer of the principality and one of the greatest Romanian authors. Contemporary of Ion Neculce, he is best known for his "Incrementa atque decrementa aulae othomanicae" ("History of the Growth and Decay of the Ottoman Empire"), a book written in Latin and translated in English in the 1730s that would remain for a century the main source of information on Ottoman history, the first one to address the topic. Cantemir was an innovator in Romanian literature and culture, being the first who wrote an allegory and a biography in Romanian. In his Descriptio Moldaviae (Berlin, 1714), he points out that the inhabitants of Moldavia, Wallachia and Transylvania spoke the same language. He notes, however, that there are some differences in accent and vocabulary saying:

"Wallachians and Transylvanians have the same speech as the Moldavians, but their pronunciation is slightly harsher, such as giur, which a Wallachian will pronounce jur, using a Polish ż or a French j. [...] They also have words that the Moldavians don't understand, but they don't use them in writing."

Cantemir's work is one of the earliest histories of the language, in which he notes, like Ureche before him, the evolution from Latin and notices the Greek, Turkish and Polish borrowings. Additionally, he introduces the idea that some words must have had Dacian roots. Cantemir also notes that while the idea of a Latin origin of the language was prevalent in his time, other scholars considered it to have derived from Italian.

In old sources, such as the works of chroniclers Grigore Ureche (1590–1647), Miron Costin (1633–1691), or those of the Prince and scholar Dimitrie Cantemir (1673–1723), the term Moldavian (moldovenească) can be found. According to Cantemir's Descriptio Moldaviae, the inhabitants of Wallachia and Transylvania spoke the same language as Moldavians, but they had a different pronunciation and used some words not understood by Moldovans. Costin and, in an unfinished book, Cantemir attest the usage of the term Romanian among the inhabitants of the Principality of Moldavia to refer to their own language.

==== In Wallachia ====
Unlike Moldavia where historical literature developed somewhat early and linearly, each chronicler adding their style and story in a chronological order, in Wallachia the development was delayed and later fragmented into political factionalism. Older documents up to early 17th century, representing brief accounts of historical moments and figures, were recorded mostly in Old Church Slavonic or sometimes in Greek, with the notable exception of Neacșu's letter.

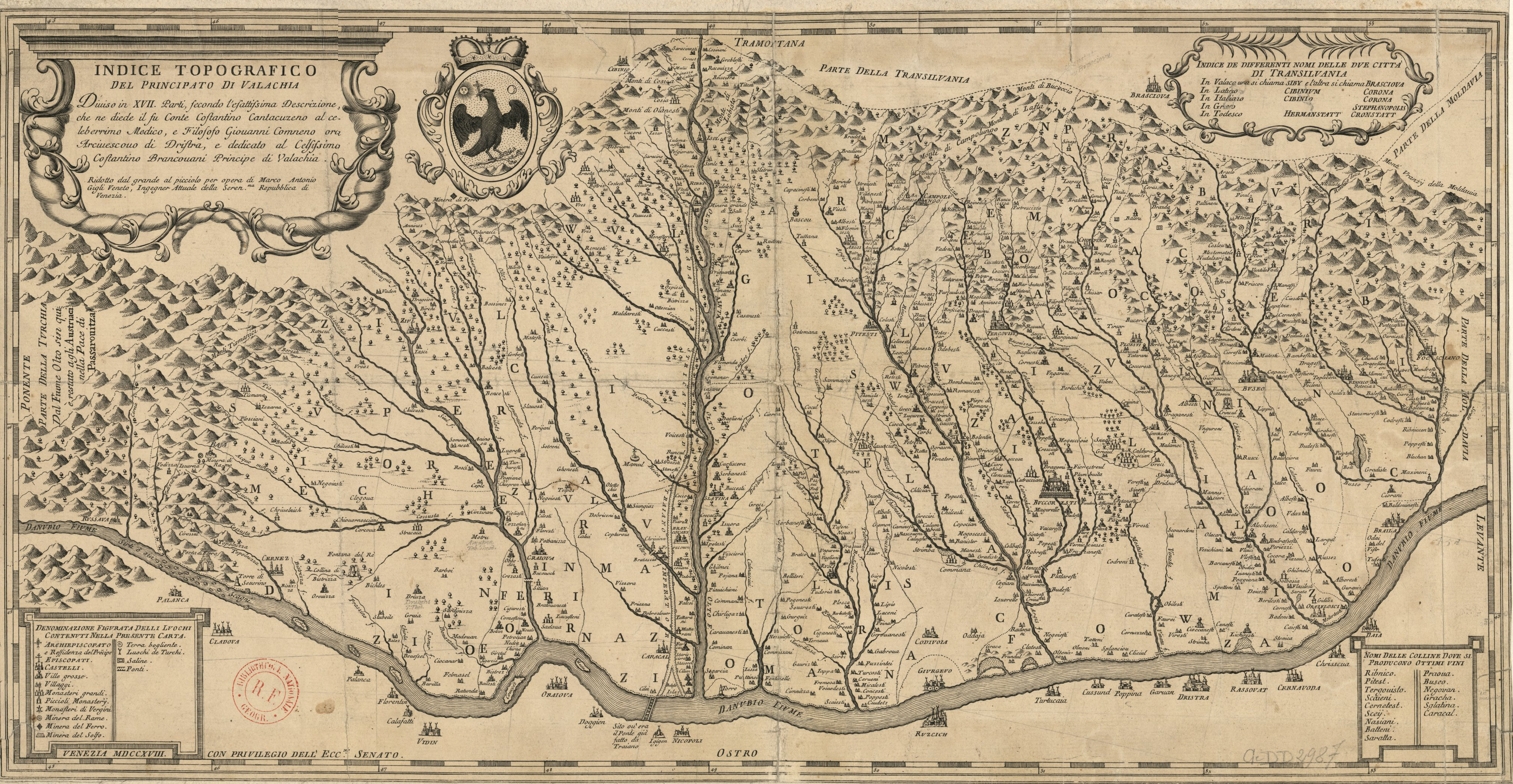
Constantin Cantacuzino's Wallachia Map

Boyar Stoica Ludescu (ca.1612-ca.1695) might have been the first to write a Wallachian chronicle in Romanian. He put together documents and attempts at chronicle writing made by predecessors, adding from his side a history of the second half of the 17th century in Wallachia, in a "savoury vulgar style":

Că adevăr cum nu se poate face din mărăcine struguri și din rug smochine, așa nu se poate face din neamul rău bun; ci din varza cea rea ce-i zic morococean, au ieșit fiiu-său și mai morococean el.

— Stoica Ludescu about the son of Radu Armașu Vărzaru.

His activity is followed by stolnic (High Stewart) Constantin Cantacuzino (1639–1716), a former student of University of Padua, who assisted with the publishing of the first complete Bible in Romanian, as well as being the author of History of Wallachia (1716), a book narrating events from the Roman colonisation until the conquest of Attila the Hun. Cantacuzino takes a different approach to the topic than the Moldavian chroniclers, asserting that modern Romanians descended directly from Roman aristocrats who he suggested assimilated the Dacians, forming a Daco-Roman nationality.

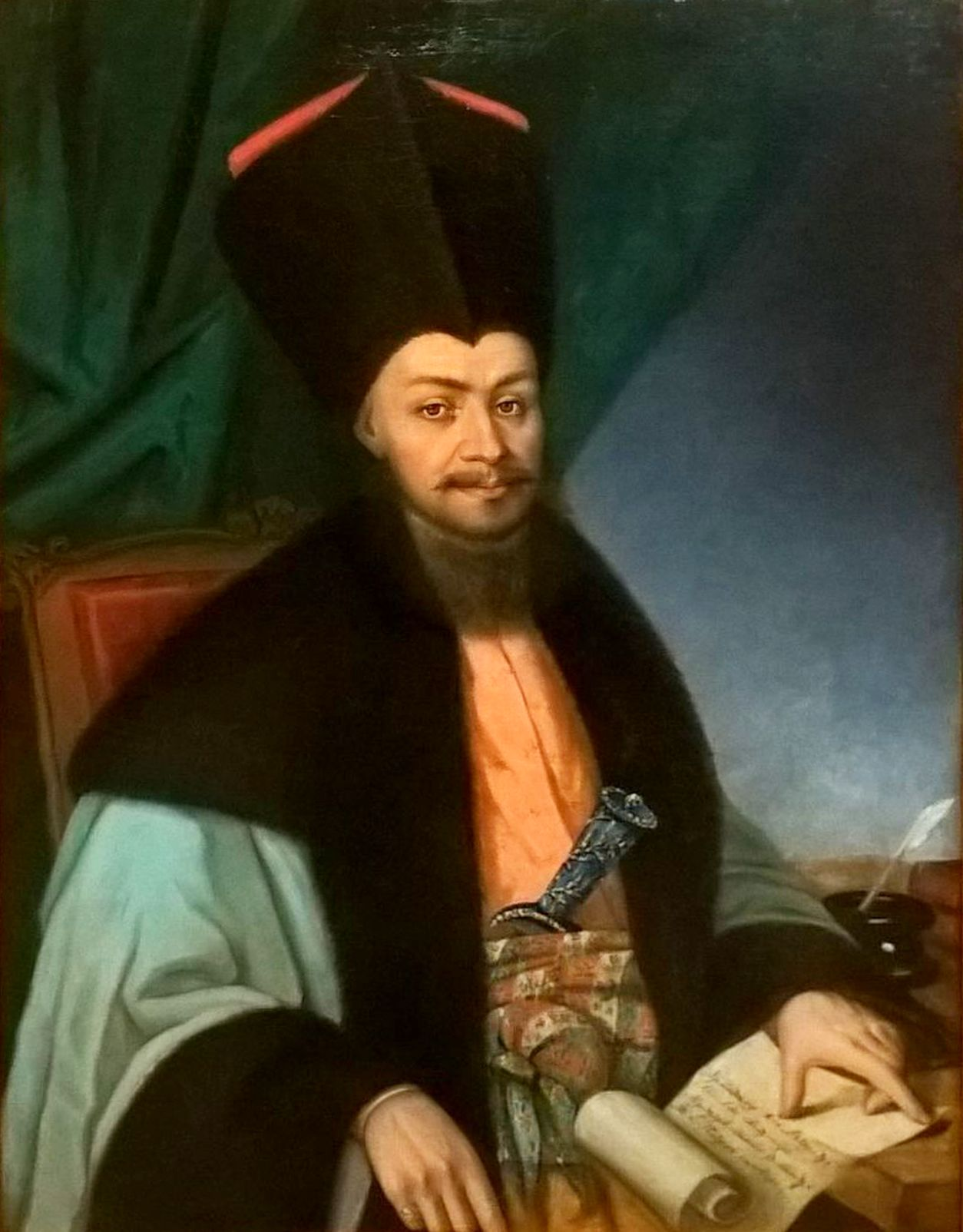
Ienăchiță Văcărescu

During the reign of Constantin Brâncoveanu, the prince's biography is recorded by courtier Radu Greceanu, praising the virtuous activities of the Romanian prince and demonstrating his legitimacy by connecting his family line to Byzantine Emperors and former Wallachian ruling family, the House of Basarab, as well as insisting on the divine right to rule. Like in Ludescu's case when a rival chronicle was written anonymously (but most likely by boyar Radu Popescu, affiliated to rival Băleni boyar faction), Greceanu's work was countered by another anonymous chronicler from an aristocratic family, arguing in favor of an elective monarchy.

Towards the end of the Old Romanian period and the beginning of Modern Romanian, during the influence of Enlightenment, the Wallachian literature in Romanian began to diversify, most notably through the members of Văcărescu family that will produce a number of poets and men and women of letters. The first one of them to be recognized by critics, Ienăchiță Văcărescu, also published a study on grammar titled "Observațiuni sau băgări dă seamă asupra regulelor și orânduelelor gramaticii românești".

==== In Transylvania and Banat ====
Comparable to the spread of Romanian language use for writing in Wallachia, the history of Romanian literature in Transylvania, Banat, and other regions where Romanians lived in the Kingdom of Hungary, was initially slow and characterized by unrelated entries before taking a more unified approach to Romanian language, culture, and political status, preceding the events of the 19th century.

The early Romanian scholars used the official languages of the Kingdom, yet the population was largely deprived of representants both in political and cultural higher echelon. A notable exception, Nicolaus Olahus, Archbishop of Esztergom (1553–1568) and correspondent of Erasmus, wrote about the Romanians of the kingdom in his Latin language description of his country "Hungaria", noting that the Romanian language in Wallachia, Moldavia, and Transylvania was originally the classical Latin of Roman colonists of Dacia.

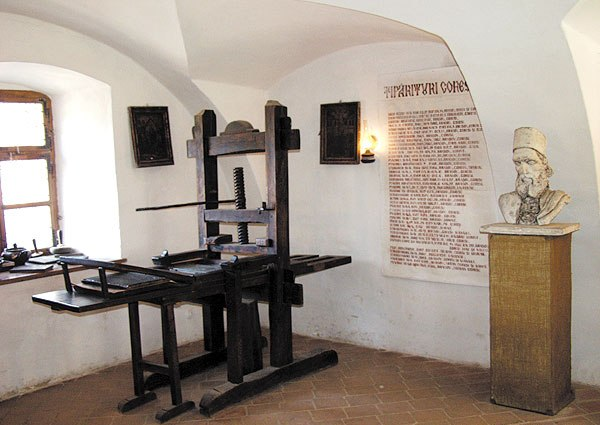
The room and printing press of Deacon Coresi, Brașov

The first books in Romanian appeared during the consolidation of Reformation and spread of the Gutenberg press in the region. Deacon Coresi, Wallachian born but active mostly in Brașov, brought his knowledge of the craft introduced to Târgoviște by Hieromonk Makarije and developed under the guidance of Dimitrije Ljubavić, among his prints being books in Romanian. The Palia de la Orăștie is the oldest translation of the Pentateuch that is written in the Romanian language. The book was printed in 1582 in the town of Orăștie, then a local center of reformation within the Principality of Transylvania, and was written using the Romanian Cyrillic alphabet.The printing was done by the deacons Serban Coresi|(son of deacon Coresi) and Marian.

In the first decades of the following century the first chronicle in Transylvania was written by the Orthodox clergyman of Brașov, Protopop Vasile, also known as Vasile the Chronicler, in which he draws a historical sketch of St. Nicolai's church at Șchei in Brașov, and lists events from 1392 to 1633 concerning local history. His work was continued only in the 18th century by the archpriest of the same city, Radu Tempea, who described among other events the Romanian Orthodox-Catholic church union of 1697–1701.

In Banat the first chronicle in Romanian was written only in the early 19th century by the Orthodox priest Nicolae Stoica. He recounted the history of the region from the origin of the world until 1825, emphasizing the events of Austro-Turkish War (1788–1791) which he witnessed.

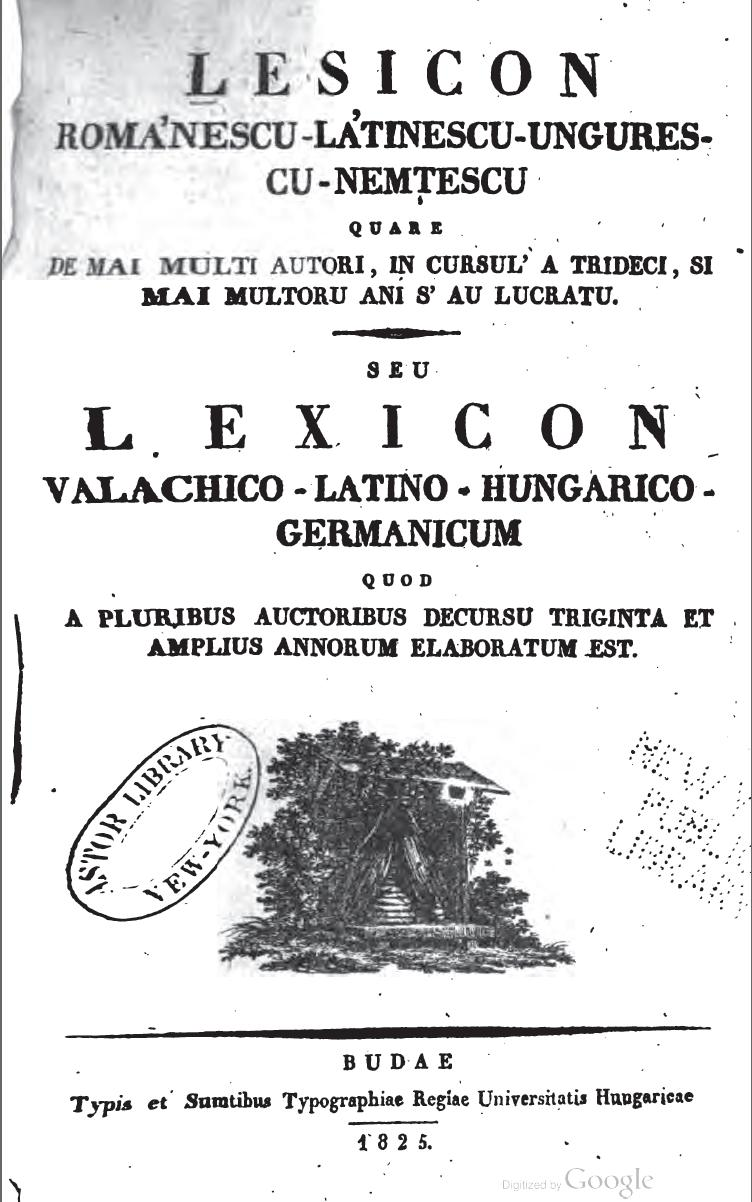
Buda Lexicon's first page

The emblematic movement that characterized the development of Romanian writing in the Kingdom of Hungary is known as the Transylvanian School, represented mainly by Samuil Micu-Klein, Petru Maior, and Gheorghe Șincai, to whom some researchers add Ion Budai-Deleanu, Ioan Monorai, and Paul Iorgovici. The so-called "School", its members being associated with the public school in Romanian established in Blaj in 1754, promoted the ideas of ethnic purity, Latinity, and continuity of Romanians in Dacia, but also published a large number of writings (translations or own works) on religious and didactic topics. Among the latter should be mentioned Șincai's The Blaj Bible, and Maior's Protopopadichia ("The power of the archpriests"). Significant for the history of the language is the interest shown in the topic of Romanian philology, individual books such as Maior's Orthographia Romana sive Latino-Valachica, una cum clavi, qua penetralia originationis vocum reserantur, together with shorter studies on etymology, orthography, and grammar will be reunited under one print in 1825 as:Lesicon románescu-látinescu-ungurescu-nemțescu quare de mai multi autori, in cursul' a trideci, si mai multoru ani s'au lucratu seu Lexicon Valachico-Latino-Hungarico-Germanici, simply known today as Buda Lexicon. Of the rich amount of books published by the members of the Transylvanian School, Samuil Micu-Klein's and Gheorghe Șincai's Elementa linguae daco-romanae sive valachicae (published in Vienna in 1780) proved to be the most influential. Within it the authors promoted the use of a Latin-based alphabet, and scientifically approached the study of Romanian grammar.

=== Modern Romanian ===
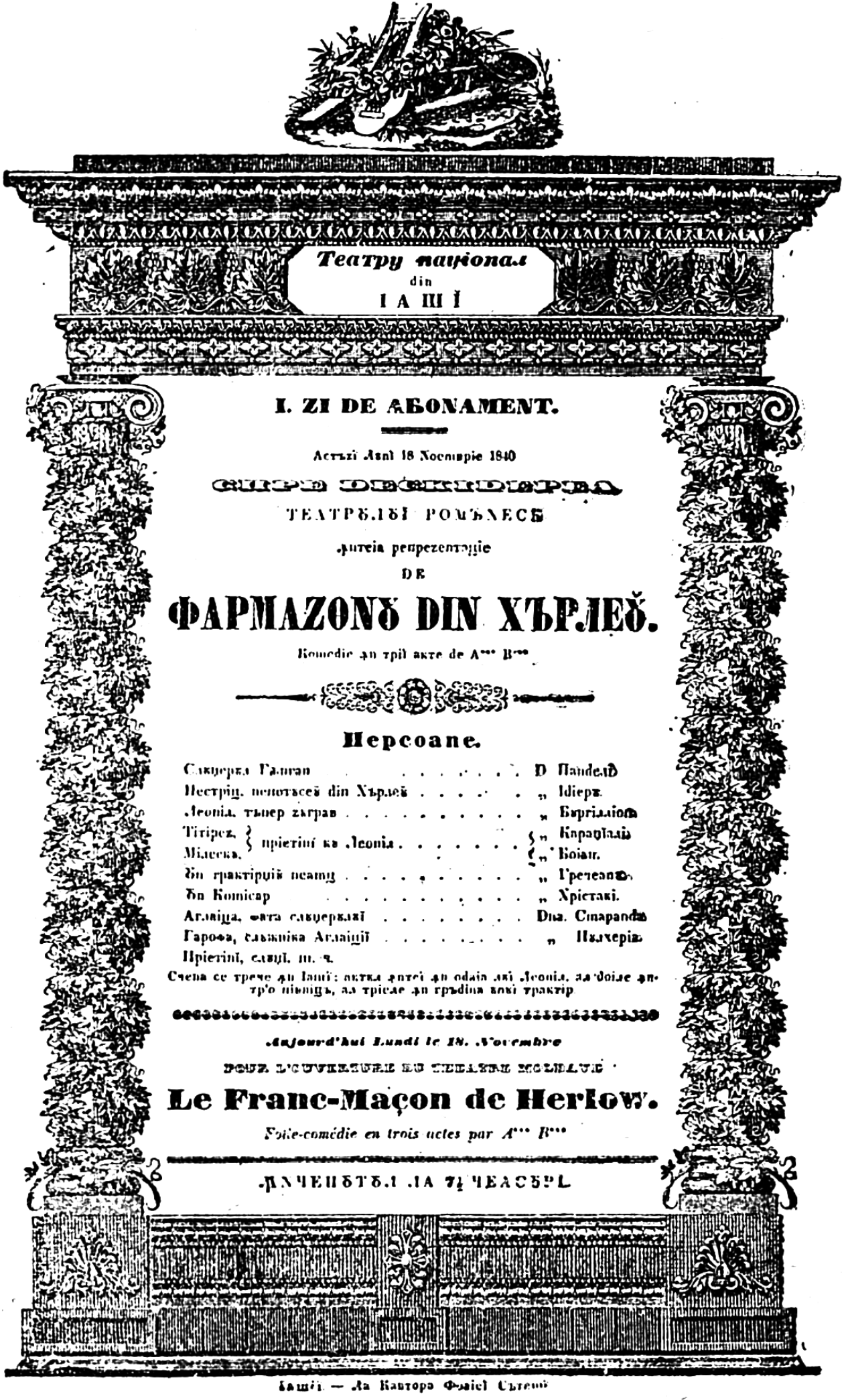
Iași National Theatre's inauguration poster: Farmazonul din Hârlău by Vasile Alecsandri, written with transitional alphabet.

The period starting from 1780, from the publishing of Elementa linguae daco-romanae sive valachicae is categorised as Modern Romanian, and is characterised by the translation, publishing and printing of books using both Cyrillic and Latin orthography, until the full implementation of the current Romanian alphabet in 1881, and by the influence of Latino-romance languages, in particular French, on the Romanian lexis. This influence, together with the adoption of the Latin script and the work of two schools of thought (Transylvanian School's Latin oriented approach and I.H. Rădulescu's Italian oriented) is the context in which the terms Re-Latinisation, Re-Romanization or Westernization are discussed. The Latin model was applied to French loanwords such as objection to "objecție", or doublets of Latin inherited words are popularised as in dens/des, both from Latin densus - dens being a loanword from French, while des, with similar meaning, is inherited from Latin.

The initial period is characterised by uncoordinated attempts to simplify the ambiguous Cyrillic spellings of Romanian. This gradual and patchy process resulted in the introduction of new letters (ț - created by Petru Maior and ș - by Gheorghe Șincai), a stage between 1828 and 1859 when transitional alphabets were used, and an academic confrontation between etymologizing (Latinizing) and broadly phonemic approaches to standards of writing. The introduction of the Latin based alphabet (at different dates in Wallachia and Transylvania - 1860, and Moldova -1862) and the setting of the first official orthography in 1881, largely based on the phonemic principle and taking mainly from Wallachian norms of pronunciation, eliminated regional differences.

=== Romanian in Imperial Russia ===
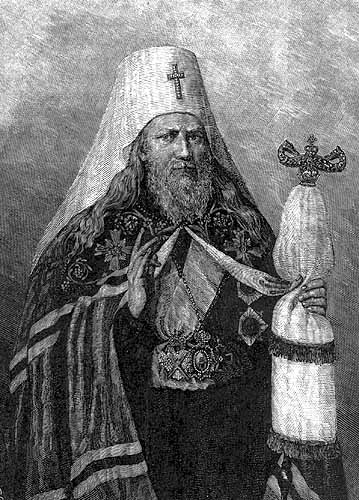
Archbishop Gavril Bănulescu-Bodoni

Following annexation of Bessarabia by Russia (after 1812), the language of Moldavians was established as an official language in the governmental institutions of Bessarabia, used along with Russian, as the overwhelming majority of the population was Romanian. The publishing works established by Archbishop Gavril Bănulescu-Bodoni were able to produce books and liturgical works in Moldavian between 1815 and 1820.

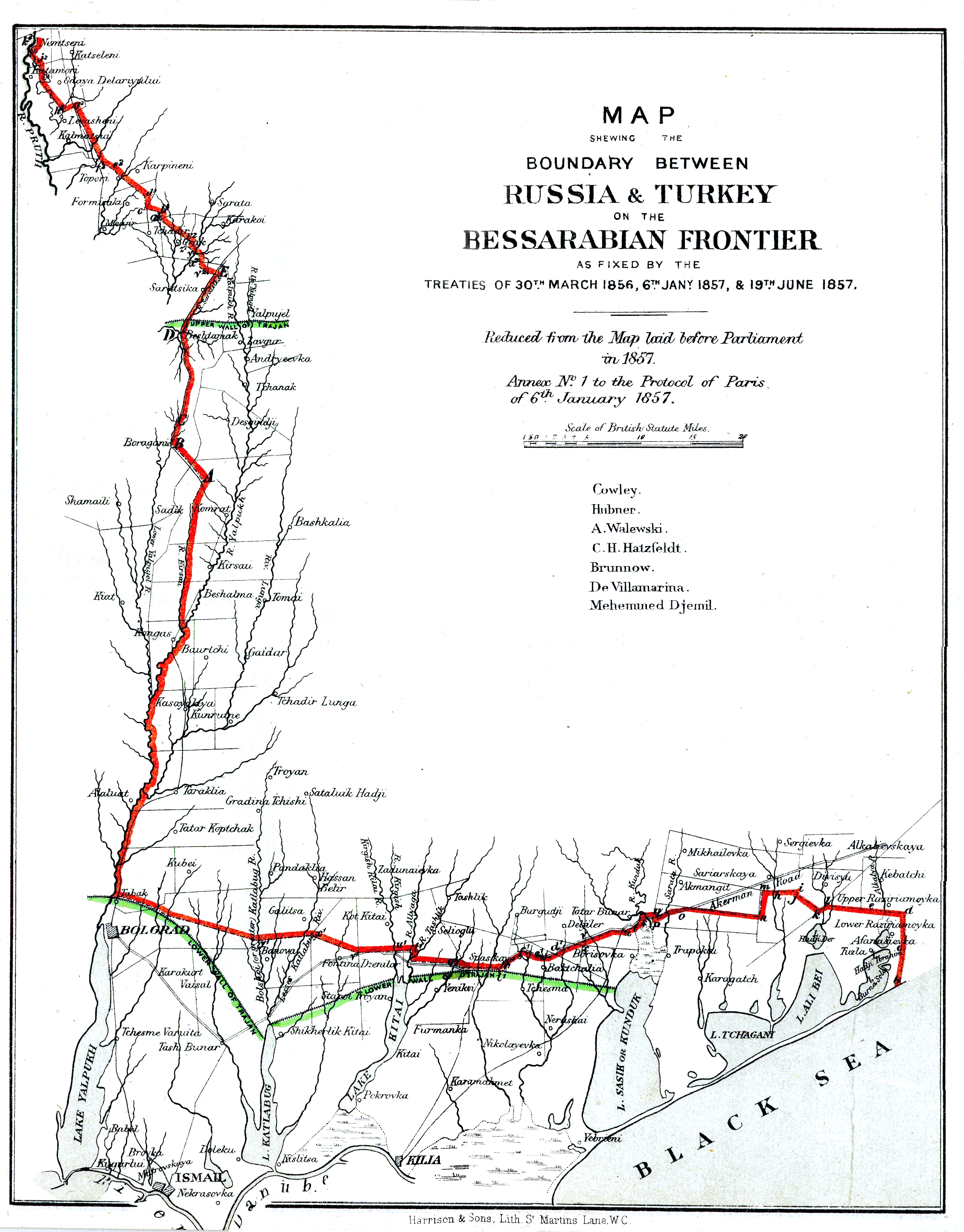
Map of the border between Moldavia/Romania and Russia, 1856-1878

Gradually, the Russian language gained importance. The new code adopted in 1829 abolished the autonomous statute of Bessarabia, and halted the obligatory use of Moldavian in public pronouncements. In 1854, Russian was declared the only official language of the region, Moldavian being eliminated from schools in the second part of the century

According to the dates provided by the administration of Bessarabia, since 1828, official documents were published in Russian only, and around 1835 a 7-year term was established during which state institutions would accept acts in the Romanian language, after which the used language would be exclusively Russian.

Romanian was accepted as the language of instruction until 1842, afterwards being taught as a separate subject. Thus, at the seminary of Chișinău, the Romanian language was a compulsory subject, with 10 hours weekly, until 1863, when the Department of Romanian was closed. At the High School No.1 in Chișinău, students had the right to choose among Romanian, German, and Greek until 9 February 1866, when the State Counselor of the Russian Empire forbade teaching of the Romanian language, with the following justification: "the pupils know this language in the practical mode, and its teaching follows other goals".

Around 1871, the tsar published an ukase "On the suspension of teaching the Romanian language in the schools of Bessarabia," because "local speech is not taught in the Russian Empire". Bessarabia became a regular guberniya and the Russification policy became a priority for the administration.

The linguistic situation in Bessarabia from 1812 to 1918 was the gradual development of bilingualism. Russian continued to develop as the official language of privilege, whereas Romanian remained the principal vernacular. The evolution of this linguistic situation can be divided into five phases.

The period from 1812 to 1828 was one of neutral or functional bilingualism. Whereas Russian had official dominance, Romanian was not without influence, especially in the spheres of public administration, education (particularly religious education) and culture. In the years immediately following the annexation, loyalty to Romanian language and customs became important. The Theological Seminary (Seminarul Teologic) and Lancaster Schools were opened in 1813 and 1824 respectively, Romanian grammar books were published, and the printing press at Chișinău began producing religious books.

The period from 1828 to 1843 was one of partial diglossic bilingualism. During this time, use of Romanian was forbidden in the sphere of administration. This was carried out through negative means: Romanian was excluded from the civil code. Romanian continued to be used in education, but only as a separate subject. Bilingual manuals, such as the Russian-Romanian Bucoavne grammar of Iacob Ghinculov, were published to meet the new need for bilingualism. Religious books and Sunday sermons remained the only monolingual public outlet for Romanian. By 1843, the removal of Romanian from public administration was complete.

The period from 1843 to 1871 was one of assimilation. Romanian continued to be a school subject at the Liceul Regional (high school) until 1866, at the Theological Seminary until 1867, and at regional schools until 1871, when all teaching of the language was forbidden by law.

The period from 1871 to 1905 was one of official monolingualism in Russian. All public use of Romanian was phased out, and substituted with Russian. Romanian continued to be used as the colloquial language of home and family. This was the era of the highest level of assimilation in the Russian Empire. In 1872, the priest Pavel Lebedev ordered that all church documents be written in Russian, and, in 1882, the press at Chișinău was closed by order of the Holy Synod.

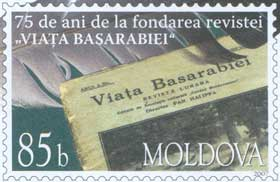
Viața Basarabiei on a 2007 Moldovan stamp

The period from 1905 to 1917 was one of increasing linguistic conflict, with the re-awakening of Romanian national consciousness. In 1905 and 1906, the Bessarabian zemstva asked for the re-introduction of Romanian in schools as a "compulsory language", and the "liberty to teach in the mother language (Romanian language)". At the same time, the first Romanian language newspapers and journals began to appear: Basarabia (1906), Viața Basarabiei (1907), Moldovanul (1907), Luminătorul (1908), Cuvînt moldovenesc (1913), Glasul Basarabiei (1913). From 1913, the synod permitted that "the churches in Besserabia use the Romanian language".

The term "Moldovan language" (limbă moldovenească) was newly employed to create a state-sponsored Ausbausprache to distinguish it from 'Romanian' Romanian. Thus, Ștefan Margeală, in 1827, stated that the aim of his book was to "offer the 800,000 Romanians who live in Bessarabia,... as well as to the millions of Romanians from the other part of Prut, the possibility of knowing the Russian language, and also for the Russians who want to study the Romanian language". In 1865 Ioan Doncev, editing his Romanian primer and grammar, affirmed that Moldovan is valaho-româno, or Romanian. However, after this date, the label "Romanian language" appears only sporadically in the correspondence of the educational authorities. Gradually, Moldovan became the sole label for the language: a situation that proved useful to those who wished for a cultural separation of Bessarabia from Romania. Although referring to another historical period, Klaus Heitmann stated that the "theory of two languages — Romanian and Moldovan — was served both in Moscow as well as in Chișinău to combat the nationalistic velleities of the Republic of Moldova, being, in fact, an action against Romanian nationalism". (Heitmann, 1965). The objective of the Russian language policies in Bessarabia was the dialectization of the Romanian language. A. Arțimovici, official of the Education Department based in Odessa, wrote a letter, dated 11 February 1863, to the Minister of Public Instructions stating: "I have the opinion that it will be hard to stop the Romanian population of Bessarabia using the language of the neighbouring principalities, where the concentrated Romanian population may develop the language based on its Latin elements, not good for Slavic language. The government's directions pertaining to this case aim to make a new dialect in Bessarabia, more closely based on Slavic language, will be, as it will be seen, of no use: we cannot direct the teachers to teach a language that will soon be dead in Moldova and Wallachia... parents will not want their children to learn a different language to the one they currently speak". Although some clerks, like Arțimovici, realised that the creation of a dialect apart from the Romanian spoken in the United Principalities could never be truly effective, most of them "with the aim of fulfilling governmental policy, tendentiously called the majority language Moldovan, even in the context where Romanian had always been used previously".

== Internal history ==
This section presents the sound changes that happened from Latin to Romanian. The order in which the sound changes are listed here is not necessarily chronological.

=== Up to Proto-Romanian ===
==== In the Vulgar Latin period ====
===== Vowels =====
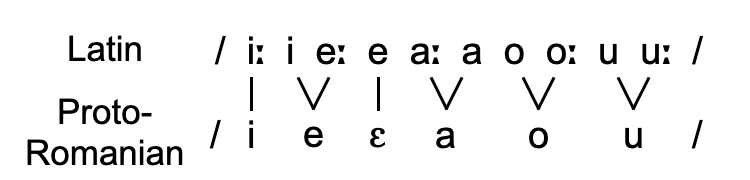
The main stressed vowel developments from Latin to Proto-Romanian.

Classical Latin had ten pure vowels (monophthongs), along with three diphthongs. By the 1st century AD, if not earlier, Latin diphthong ae became [ɛː], with the quality of short e but longer; and oe soon afterwards became [eː], merging with long ē. This left au. An early trend in the urban Latin of Rome, already during Cicero's time (c. 50 BC), merged it with ō, and a few common words reflect this in Romanian, e.g. coadă "tail" < cōda < Classical cauda; similarly ureche "ear" < ōricla < Classical auricula. But in general, the territories outside of Rome were unaffected by this change; /au/ remained everywhere for centuries afterward, and continues to this day in Romanian.

Long and short e, i, o, u differed in both quality and quantity, with the shorter versions lower and laxer (e.g. e [ɛ] vs. ē [eː]). Long and short a differed only in quantity. At a certain point, quantity ceased being phonemic, with all vowels long in stressed open syllables and short elsewhere. This automatically caused long and short a to merge, but the remaining vowels took three different paths:

- In the Sardinian scheme, long and short pairs of vowels simply merge, with the quality difference erased, producing a five vowel system.
- In the Italo-Western scheme, the quality difference remains, but original short i, u [ɪ], [ʊ] are lowered and merge with original long ē, ō [e], [o]; producing a seven vowel system. Subsequent to this, unstressed low-mid vowels are raised to become high-mid.
- In the Sicilian scheme, the quality difference is erased and original long Ē, Ō [e], [o] are raised and merged with original short I, U [ɪ], [ʊ] and original long Ī, Ū [i], [u]; producing a five vowel system. However, this can be derived from the Italo-Western scheme.
- In the Taravo scheme, mid-vowels e, o follow the Sardinian scheme, while short and long high vowels are still distinguished.

Romanian and other Eastern Romance languages follow a mixed scheme, with the back vowels o, u following the Sardinian scheme but the front vowels e, i following the Western Romance scheme. This produces a six-vowel system (contrast the Sardinian and Sicilian five-vowel system and Western Romance seven-vowel system).

Short and long back vowels merged, for example:

- Lat. mare > Rom. mare ('sea')
- Lat. pālum > *paru > Rom. par ('pole')
- Lat. focum > *focu > Rom. foc ('fire')
- Lat. pōmum > *pomu > Rom. pom ('fruit-bearing tree')
- Lat. multum > *multu > Rom. mult ('much')
- Lat. tū > Rom. tu ('you')

Latin short u seems to have been lowered to o when stressed and before m or b in some words:

- Lat. autumna (from autumnus) > *tomna > Rom. toamnă ('autumn')
- Lat. rubeum > *robi̯u > Rom. roib

Also, Latin long ō was changed to u in a few words:

- Lat. cohortem > *cōrtem > Rom. curte

Front vowels changed as follows:

- ē/oe and i became /e/.
- ī became /i/.
- e/ae became:
  - /ɛ/ in stressed syllables
  - /e/ in unstressed syllables
- Subsequent to this, stressed /ɛ/ diphthongized to /je/.

Examples:

Lat. pellem > *pɛlle > Rom. piele /pjele/ ('skin')
Lat. signum > *semnu > Rom. semn ('sign')
Lat. vīnum > *vinu > Rom. vin ('wine')

Romanian showed resistance to syncope, keeping the syllables from Latin in most cases (ex: piersică < persĭca), except for words where syncope occurred early, even before Latin arrived in Dacia (ex: cald < calĭdu). It also kept intervocalic stops and [g] (ex: deget < digitus).

====== Breaking of stressed open e ======
In Romanian, as in a number of other Romance languages, stressed /ɛ/ (including from original ae) broke (diphthongized) to */je/. This happened in all syllables, whether open or closed, similarly to Spanish, but unlike Italian or French, where this breaking only happened in open syllables (those followed by only a single consonant).

- Lat. pellem > *pɛlle > Rom. piele /pjele/ 'skin'

Frequently, the /j/ was later absorbed by a preceding consonant, by the operation of second palatalization.

- Lat. decem > *dɛce > *di̯ece > *dzece > Rom. zece 'ten'

The /e/ was later affected by other changes in certain circumstances, e.g. breaking to /e̯a/ or lowering to /a/:

- Lat. equa > *ɛpa > *i̯epa > Rom. iapă 'mare'
- Lat. terra > *tɛrra > *ti̯era > *țera > archaic țeară > Rom. țară 'land'
- Lat. testa > *tɛsta > *ti̯esta > *țesta > Rom. țeastă 'skull'

====== Breaking of e and o ======
The vowel o was broken (diphthongized) to oa before a non-high vowel:

- Lat. flōrem > Rom. floare 'flower'
- Lat. hōram > Rom. oară 'time' as in "a treia oară" 'the third time'

The vowel e was broken to ea in similar circumstances. The e was often absorbed by a preceding palatal sound:

- Lat. equa > *ɛpa > *i̯epa > *i̯eapa > Rom. iapă 'mare'
- Lat. terra > *tɛrra > *țera > archaic țeară > Rom. țară 'land'
- Lat. testa > *tɛsta > *țesta > Rom. țeastă 'skull'

As a result, these diphthongs still alternate with the original monophthongs by occurring regularly before a, ă and e in the next syllable (with the exception that ea has reverted to e before another e, e.g. mensae > mease > mese 'tables', as explained in the next section).

====== Backing of e ======
The vowel e was changed to ă – and the diphthong ea was reduced to a – when preceded by a labial consonant and followed by a back vowel in the next syllable. In other words, it stayed e, when the following vowel was i or e. Furthermore, in front of these vowels, the diphthong ea changed back to e.

- Lat. pilus > peru > Rom. păr 'hair', but
- Lat. pilī > Rom. peri 'hairs'
- Lat. pira > peară > Rom. pară 'pear', but
- Lat. pirae > peare > Rom. pere 'pears'
- Lat. mēnsam > *mesa > measă > Rom. masă 'table', but
- Lat. mēnsae > mease > Rom. mese 'tables'
- Lat. vēndō > *vendu > *văndu > *vându > Rom. vând 'I sell', but
- Lat. vēndis > *vendī > *vendzi > vindzi > Rom. vinzi 'you sell'

This phonetic change is characteristic for standard Romanian, but it did not affect the dialect spoken in Țara Hațegului.

The consonant r also causes backing of e to ă: Lat. rēus > Rom. rău ‘bad’. Another source of ă is that a raises to ă in front of /i/ in the next syllable, e.g. mare ‘sea’, but mări ‘seas’.

====== Vowel reduction ======
Unstressed a became ă (except when at the beginning of the word) and unstressed o was reduced to u. Then ă became e after palatal consonants. Unstressed o was kept in some words due to analogy.

- Lat. capra > Rom. capră ‘goat’
- Lat. vīnea > *vinja > *viɲă (cf. Megleno-Romanian) > *viɲe (cf. Aromanian) > Rom. vie /ˈvije/ ‘vineyard’
- Lat. formōsus > *frumosu > Rom. frumos ‘beautiful’

====== Phonemicisation of ă, pre-nasal raising and emergence of /ɨ/ ======
As the definite article -a emerged, it created new word forms with unstressed -/a/: casă /ˈkasə/ ‘house’ ~ casa /ˈkasa/ ‘the house.’ Furthermore, instances of stressed ă arose from original a before a /n/ or a consonant cluster beginning with /m/. Subsequently, ă under the same conditions (from original a as well as from e after it first evolved into i) developed into the vowel [ɨ] (currently spelt as î at word edges and â elsewhere), e.g. Lat. campus > Rom. câmp ‘field’, Lat. ventus > vintu (Aromanian) > Rom. vânt ‘wind’. This was part of a general process of pre-nasal raising, which also affected the other vowels: Lat. bene > Rom. bine ‘well’, Lat. nomen > Rom. nume ‘name’. Latin i also sometimes produces /ɨ/ before nasals: Lat. sinus > sân ‘breast’. Subsequently, deletion of /n/ in some words produces instances of phonemic /ɨ/: Lat. quantus > Rom. cât ‘how much’.

The same vowel also arises from i, e and ă in front of a cluster of /r/ and a following cosonant: Lat. virtutem > Rom. vârtute ‘virtue’, Lat. pergola > Rom. pârghie ‘lever’, Lat. tardivus > Rom. târziu ‘late’. The vowel also arises from i after /r/: Lat. ridet > Rom. râde ‘laughs’. Further instances of /ɨ/ arose with the introduction of Slavic and, later, Turkish loanwords.

===== Consonants =====
====== Labiovelars ======
In the Vulgar Latin period, the labiovelars ⟨qu gu⟩ /kʷ ɡʷ/ were reduced to simple velars /k ɡ/ before front vowels. These were subsequently palatalized to /tʃ dʒ/ by the second palatalization (see below):

- Lat. quaerere "to seek" > *kɛrere > Rom. cere 'ask'
- Lat. sanguis "blood" > *sange > Rom. sânge /ˈsɨndʒe/

The labiovelars originally remained before a, but were subsequently changed to labials /p b/, although in question words beginning with qu-, this was never changed to p- (presumably through analogy with words beginning que-, qui-, quo- in Latin):

- Lat. quattuor > *quattro > Rom. patru 'four'
- Lat. equa > *ɛpa > *eapa > Rom. iapă 'mare'
- Lat. lingua > Rom. limbă 'tongue'
- But Lat. quandō > *kando > kăndu (Aromanian) > Rom. când 'when'

====== Labialization of velars ======
Another important change is the labialization of velars before dentals, which includes the changes ct > pt, gn [ŋn] > mn, and x [ks] > ps or s when the stressed syllable proceeds the x

- Lat. factum > *faptu > Rom. fapt 'fact; deed'
- Lat. signum > *semnu > Rom. semn 'sign'
- Lat. coxa > *copsa > Rom. coapsă 'thigh', but:
- Lat. fraxinus > frapsinu (Aromanian) > Rom. frasin 'ash tree' (vs. Banat frapsăn, frapsine)
- Lat. laxō > Rom. las 'I let'

====== Final consonants ======
In both Romanian and Italian, virtually all final consonants were lost. As a consequence, there was a period in the history of Romanian in which all words ended with vowels. In addition, after a long vowel final -s produced a new final -i, as in Lat. nōs > Rom. noi 'we', Lat. trēs > Rom. trei 'three', and Lat. stās > Rom. stai 'you stand'.

====== Palatalization ======
In Vulgar Latin, short /e/ and /i/ followed by another vowel were changed to a glide /j/. Later, /j/ palatalized preceding coronal and velar consonants, changing its quality.

- for /tj kj/, the outcomes in Romanian diverged as such:
  - /tj kj/ followed by /a/ and /o/ or /u/ in final position resulted in [t͡s]
    - Lat. puteus > *púti̯u > *putsu > Rom. puț 'well, pit',
    - Lat. socium > *sóti̯u > *sotsu > Rom. soț 'companion; husband'
  - /tj kj/ followed by /o/ or /u/ in non-final position resulted in [t͡ʃ]
    - Lat. rōgātiōnem > *rogati̯óne > *rogačone > Rom. rugăciune 'prayer'
- other consonants:
  - VLat. deosum > *di̯ósu > *djosu > Rom. jos 'down'
  - Lat. hordeum > *órdi̯u > ordzu > Rom. orz 'barley',
  - Lat. cāseus > *kasi̯u > Rom. caș 'fresh, unripened cheese'
  - Lat. vīnea > *vini̯a > *viɲe > standard Rom. vie /ˈvije/
  - Lat. mulierem > *muli̯ere > *muʎere > Rom. muiere /muˈjere/ 'woman'

The above palatalizations occurred in all of the Romance languages, although with slightly differing outcomes in different languages. Labial consonants, however, were unaffected by the above palatalizations. Instead, at a later time, the /j/ underwent metathesis:

- Lat. rubeum > *robi̯u > Rom. roib

====== Palatalization of cl and gl clusters ======
The Latin cluster cl was palatalized to /kʎ/, which later simplified to /k/. The same process affected Latin gl:

- Vulgar Latin oricla > *urecʎa > *urecʎe (Aromanian ureaclje) > Rom. ureche 'ear'
- Vulgar Latin glacia > *gʎatsa > Rom. gheață 'ice'

====== l-rhotacism ======
At some point, Latin intervocalic l developed into r. From the evolution of certain words, it is clear that this happened after the above-mentioned palatalization, but before the simplification of double consonants (as ll did not rhotacize) and also before i-palatalization. Some examples:

- Lat. gelu > Rom. ger 'frost'
- Lat. salīre > Rom. a sări (sărire) 'to jump'

====== Second palatalization ======
The dental consonants t, d, s, l were palatalized again by a following i or i̯ (from the combination i̯e/i̯a < ɛ < stressed e):

- Lat. testa > *tɛsta > *țesta > Rom. țeastă 'skull'
- Lat. decem > *dɛce > *dzeace > Rom. zece 'ten'
- Lat. servum > *sɛrbu > *si̯erbu > Rom. șerb 'serf'
- Lat. sex > *sɛkse > *seasse > Rom. șase 'six'
- Lat. leporem > *lɛpore > *li̯ɛpure > *ʎɛpure (= Arom. ljepure) > Rom. iepure 'hare'
- Lat. dīcō > *dzicu > Rom. zic 'I say'
- Lat. līnum > *ʎinu (= Arom. ljinu) > *ʎin > Rom. in 'flax'
- Lat. gallīna > *ɡalina > *ɡăʎină (= Arom. gãljinã) > Rom. găină 'hen'

The velar consonants /k ɡ/ (from Latin labiovelars qu gu) were palatalized to /tʃ dʒ/ before front vowels:

- Lat. quid > *ki > Rom. ce 'what'
- Lat. quīnque > Vulgar Latin *cīnque (Italian cinque) > Rom. cinci "five"
- Lat. quaerere "to seek" > *kɛrere > Rom. cere 'ask'
- Lat. *sanguem > *sange > Rom. sânge 'blood'

=== Modern changes ===
These are changes that did not happen in all Eastern Romance languages. Some occur in standard Romanian; some do not.

==== Spirantization ====
In southern dialects, and in the standard language, dz is lost as a phoneme, becoming z in all environments:

- dzic > zic ('I say')
- lucredzi > lucrezi ('you work')

The affricate /dʒ/ became j /ʒ/ only when hard (i.e. followed by a back vowel):

- gioc /dʒok/ > joc ('game'), but:
- deget /ˈdedʒet/ ('finger') did not change.

==== Lenition of resonants ====
Former palatal resonants /ʎ ɲ/ were both lenited (weakened) to /j/, which was subsequently lost next to /i/:

- Lat. leporem > *lɛpore > *li̯epure > *ʎepure > Rom. iepure 'hare'
- Lat. līnum > *ʎinu > *ʎin > Rom. in 'flax'
- Lat. gallīna > *ɡallina > *ɡalina > *ɡăʎină > Rom. găină 'hen'
- Lat. pellem, pellīs > *pɛlle, pɛlli > *pi̯ele, pi̯eli > *pi̯ele, pi̯eʎi > Rom. piele, piei 'skin, skins'
- Lat. vīnea > *vinja > *viɲă > *viɲe > Rom. vie /ˈvije/ 'vineyard'

Former intervocalic /l/ from Latin -ll- was lost entirely before /a/ by first vocalizing to /w/:

- Lat stēlla > *stela > archaic steală > colloquial steauă > standard Rom. stea 'star'
- Lat sella > *sɛlla > *si̯ela > *șela > *șeuă > Muntenian șea > standard Rom. șa 'saddle'

Former intervocalic /l/ from Latin -ll- was preserved before other vowels:

- Lat caballum > *cavallu > *caalu > Rom. cal 'horse'
- Lat callem > Rom. cale 'way'

Former intervocalic /v/ (from Latin -b-,-v-) was lost, perhaps first weakened to /w/:

- Lat būbalus > *buvalu > *buwaru > archaic buar, boar > standard Rom. bour 'aurochs'
- Lat vīvere > *vivere > *viwe > Muntenian vie > standard Rom. a via 'to live'

==== n-epenthesis ====
Relatively recently, stressed u preceded by n lengthens and nasalizes, producing a following n (epenthesis).

- Lat genuculus > *genuclus > western genuchi > Rom. genunchi 'knee'
- Lat manuplus > *manuclus > western mănuchi > Rom. mănunchi 'bouquet'
- Lat minutus > minut (Aromanian) > (Banat, Moldavia) mănunt > Rom. mărunt 'minute, small'
- the reverse process:
  - Lat ranunculus 'tadpole; crowfoot, buttercup' > *ranunclus > archaic rănunchi > Rom. rărunchi 'kidney; (dial.) buttercup' > dialectal răruchi

==== j-epenthesis ====
In some words, the semivowel /j/ was inserted between â and soft n:

- pâne > pâine ('bread')
- câne > câine ('dog')

It also explains the plural mână - mâini ('hand, hands'). This is also specific to southern dialects and the standard language; in other regions one may hear câne etc.

It may be compensatory lengthening followed by dissimilation: pâne > pââne > pâine. It has spread from the Oltenian dialect to literary Romanian. It has alternatively been explained as palatalization followed by metathesis: câne > *câni̯e > câine. Oltenian has câine; all other dialects have câni̯e.

==== Hardening ====
Backing of vowels after ș, ț and dz is specific to northern dialects. Because those consonants can be followed only by back vowels, any front vowel is changed to a back one:

- și > șî 'and'
- ține > țâni̯e 'holds'
- zic > dzâc 'I say'

It is similar to vowel backing after hard consonants in Russian (see Russian phonology § Front vowels).

== See also ==
- Albanian–Eastern Romance linguistic parallels
- Legacy of the Roman Empire
- Old Romanian

== Sources ==
=== Primary sources ===
- Procopius: History of the Wars (Books VI.16–VII.35.) (With an English Translation by H. B. Dewing) (2006). Harvard University Press. ISBN 06-7499-191-5.
- The Chronicle of Theophanes Confessor: Byzantine and Near Eastern History, AD 284–813 (Translated with Introduction and Commentary by Cyril Mango and Roger Scott with the assistance of Geoffrey Greatrex) (2006). Oxford University Press. ISBN 978-0-19-822568-3.
- The History of Theophylact Simocatta (An English Translation with Introduction and Notes: Michael and Mary Whitby) (1986). Clarendon Press. ISBN 01-9822-799-X.

=== Secondary sources ===
- Alkire, Ti; Rosen, Carol (2010). Romance Languages: A Historical Introduction. Cambridge University Press. ISBN 978-0-52-171784-7.
- Augerot, J. (2009). "Romanian". In Brown, Keith; Ogilvie, Sarah (eds.). Concise Encyclopedia of Languages of the World. Elsevier. pp. 900–904. ISBN 978-0-08-087774-7.
- Brezianu, Andrei; Spânu, Vlad (2010). The A to Z of Moldova. Scarecrow Press. ISBN 978-0-8108-7211-0.
- Carlton, Terence R. (1991). Introduction to the Phonological History of the Slavic Languages. Slavica Publishers. ISBN 08-9357-223-3.
- Densusianu, Ovide (1901). Histoire de la langue roumaine [=History of the Romanian language] (in French). Ernest Leroux.
- Fine, John V. A (1991). The Early Medieval Balkans: A Critical Survey from the Sixth to the Late Twelfth century. The University of Michigan Press. ISBN 04-7208-149-7.
- Fortson, Benjamin W. IV (2004). Indo-European Language and Culture: An Introduction. Blackwell Publishing. ISBN 978-1-40-510316-9.
- Georgescu, Vlad (1991). The Romanians: A History. Ohio State University Press. ISBN 08-1420-511-9.
- Hall, Robert A. Jr. (1974). External History of the Romance Languages. American Elsevier Publishing Company. ISBN 04-4400-136-0.
- Harris, Martin (1998). Harris, Martin; Vincent, Nigel (eds.). The Romance Languages. Oxford University Press. pp. 1–25. ISBN 01-9520-829-3.
- Haynes, Rebecca (2020). Moldova: A History. Bloomsbury Publishing. ISBN 978-1-78831-813-6.
- Izzo, Herbert J. (1986). "On the history of Romanian". In Marino, Mary C.; Pérez, Luis A. (eds.). The Twelfth LACUS Forum, 1985. Linguistic Association of Canada and the United States. pp. 139–146.
- Madgearu, Alexandru (2005). The Romanians in the Anonymous Gesta Hungarorum: Truth and Fiction. Romanian Cultural Institute, Center for Transylvanian Studies. ISBN 97-3778-401-4.
- Mallinson, Graham (1998). "Rumanian". In Harris, Martin; Vincent, Nigel (eds.). The Romance Languages. Oxford University Press. pp. 391–419. ISBN 01-9520-829-3.
- van Meurs, Wim (1994). The Bessarabian question in communist historiography. Nationalist and communist politics and history-writing. Columbia University Press. ISBN 0-88033-284-0.
- Mihăescu, H. (1993). La Romanité dans le Sud-Est de L'Europe [=The Romans in South-Eastern Europe] (in French). Editura Academiei Române. ISBN 97-3270-342-3.
- Mišeska Tomić, Olga (2006). Balkan Sprachbund Morpho-Syntactic Features. Springer. ISBN 978-1-40-204487-8.
- Mitrasca, Marcel (2007). Moldova: A Romanian Province Under Russian Rule : Diplomatic History from the Archives of the Great Powers. Algora Publishing. ISBN 978-0-87586-184-5.
- Nandriș, Grigore (December 1951), "The development and structure of Rumanian", The Slavonic and East European Review, 30 (74): 7–33
- Nandris, John (1976). The Dacian Iron Age: A Comment in a European Context. Leipzig: Deuticke.
- Niculescu, Alexandru. Outline History of the Romanian Language.
- Pei, Mario (1976). The Story of Latin and the Romance Languages. Harper & Row, Publishers. ISBN 00-6013-312-0.
- Petrescu-Dîmbovița, Mircea (1978). Scurta istorie a Daciei Preromane. Junimea.
- Petrucci, Peter R. (1999). Slavic Features in the History of Rumanian. LINCOM EUROPA. ISBN 38-9586-599-0.
- Pop, Ioan-Aurel (1999). Romanians and Romania: A Brief History. Boulder. ISBN 08-8033-440-1.
- Posner, Rebecca (1996). The Romance Languages. Cambridge University Press. ISBN 978-0-52-128139-3.
- Purici, Ștefan (2011). Istoria Basarabiei [The history of Bessarabia]. Editura Semne. ISBN 978-606-15-0131-1.
- Sala, Marius (2012). De la Latină la Română [From Latin to Romanian]. Editura Pro Universitaria. ISBN 978-606-647-435-1.
- Schramm, Gottfried (1997). Ein Damm bricht. Die römische Donaugrenze und die Invasionen des 5-7. Jahrhunderts in Lichte der Namen und Wörter [=A Dam Breaks: The Roman Danube frontier and the Invasions of the 5th-7th Centuries in the Light of Names and Words] (in German). R. Oldenbourg Verlag. ISBN 34-8656-262-2.
- Schulte, Kim (2009). "Loanwords in Romanian". In Haspelmath, Martin; Tadmor, Uri (eds.). Loanwords in the World's Languages: A Comparative Handbook. De Gruyter Mouton. pp. 230–259. ISBN 978-3-11-021843-5.
- Schütz, István (2002). Fehér foltok a Balkánon: Bevezetés az albanológiába és a balkanisztikába [=Blank Spots in the Balkans: Introduction to Albanology and Balkanistics] (in Hungarian). Balassi Kiadó. ISBN 96-3506-472-1.
- Spinei, Victor (2009). The Romanians and the Turkic Nomads North of the Danube Delta from the Tenth to the Mid-Thirteenth century. Koninklijke Brill NV. ISBN 978-9-00-417536-5.
- Vékony, Gábor (2000). Dacians, Romans, Romanians. Matthias Corvinus Publishing. ISBN 18-8278-513-4.
- Wilkes, John (1992). The Illyrians. Blackwell. ISBN 06-3119-807-5.
