= Torna, torna, fratre =

First recorded sentence in Balkan Latin

Torna, torna, fratre (τόρνα, τόρνα, φράτρε; "turn, turn, brother") is a phrase attested by the Byzantine monk and chronicler Theophanes the Confessor in his Chronographia (c. 810–814). The words torna, torna (τóρνα, τóρνα; "turn, turn") had already been attested two centuries prior by the Byzantine historiographer Theophylact Simocatta in his Histories, (c. 630). Both chroniclers referred to an episode during Maurice's Balkan campaigns in 587 against the Pannonian Avars, and the phrase is today considered by scholars to be an attestation of Common Romanian, the common ancestor of the Eastern Romance languages (Romanian, Aromanian, Megleno-Romanian, Istro-Romanian).

== History ==
In Theophylactus Simocatta's Histories, (c. 630), the author mentions the words τóρνα, τóρνα. The context of this mention is a Byzantine expedition during Maurice's Balkan campaigns in 587, led by general Comentiolus, in the Haemus, against the Pannonian Avars. The success of the campaign was compromised by an incident during a night march:

a beast of burden had shucked off his load. It happened as his master was marching in front of him. But the ones who were coming from behind and saw the animal dragging his burden after him, had shouted to the master to turn around and straighten the burden. Well, this event was the reason for a great agitation in the army, and started a flight to the rear, because the shout was known to the crowd: the same words were also a signal, and it seemed to mean "run", as if the enemies had appeared nearby more rapidly than could be imagined. There was a great turmoil in the host, and a lot of noise; all were shouting loudly and goading each other to turn back, calling with great unrest in the language of the country "torna, torna", as a battle had suddenly started in the middle of the night.

Nearly two centuries after Theophylactus, the same episode is retold by another Byzantine chronicler, Theophanes the Confessor, in his Chronographia (c. 810–814). He mentions the words τόρνα, τόρνα, φράτρε [torna, torna, fratre; "turn, turn, brother"]:

A beast of burden had thrown off his load, and somebody yelled to his master to reset it, saying in the language of their parents/of the land: "torna, torna, fratre". The master of the animal didn't hear the shout, but the people heard him, and believing that they are attacked by the enemy, started running, shouting loudly: "torna, torna".

The first to identify the excerpts as examples of early Romanian was Johann Erich Thunmann in 1774. Since then, a debate among scholars had been going on to identify whether the language in question is a sample of early Romanian, or just a Byzantine command (of Latin origin, as it appears as such–torna–in Emperor Maurice's Strategikon), and with fratre used as a colloquial form of address between the Byzantine soldiers. The main debate revolved around the expressions ἐπιχώριoς γλῶσσα (epichorios glossa – Theopylactus) and πάτριoς φωνή (pátrios foní – Theophanes), and what they actually meant.

An important contribution to the debate was Romanian historian Nicolae Iorga's first noticing in 1905 of the duality of the term torna in Theophylactus' text: the shouting to get the attention of the master of the animal (in the language of the country), and the misunderstanding of this by the bulk of the army as a military command (due to the resemblance with the Latin military command). Iorga considers the army to have been composed of both auxiliary (τολδον) Romanised Thracians—speaking ἐπιχωρίᾳ τε γλώττῃ (the "language of the country"/"language of their parents/of the natives") —and of Byzantines (a mélange of ethnicities using Byzantine words of Latin origin as official command terms, as attested in the Strategikon).

This view was later supported by the Greek historian A. Keramopoulos (1939), as well as by Alexandru Philippide (1925), who considered that the word torna should not be understood as a solely military command term, because it was, as supported by chronicles, a word "of the country", as by the year 600, the bulk of the Byzantine army was raised from barbarian mercenaries and the Romanic population of the Balkan Peninsula.

Starting from the second half of the 20th century, many Romanian scholars consider it a sample of early Romanian language, a view with supporters such as Al. Rosetti (1960), Petre Ș. Năsturel (1956) and I. Glodariu (1964).

In regards to the Latin term torna (an imperative form of the verb torno), in modern Romanian, the corresponding or descendant term toarnă now means "pour" (a conjugated form of the verb turna – "to pour"). However, in older or early Romanian, the verb also had the sense of "to return or come back", and this sense is also still preserved in the modern Aromanian verb tornu and in some derived words in modern Romanian (for example: înturna "return, turn", răsturna "turn over, knock down").

== See also ==
- Vulgar Latin
- Daco-Roman
- History of the Romanian language
- Proto-Romance language
