= Common Romanian =

Comparatively reconstructed ancestor of the Romanian languages

- Proto-Romanian
- Reconstruction of: Eastern Romance languages
- Region: Balkans and part of Eastern Europe
- Era: c. 6th or 7th – 10th or 11th centuries
- Reconstructed ancestors: Proto-Indo-European: Proto-Italic; Proto-Romance

Common Romanian (Romanian: română comună), also known as Ancient Romanian (străromână), or Proto-Romanian (protoromână), is a comparatively reconstructed Romance language which evolved from Vulgar Latin and was spoken by the ancestors of today's Romanians, Aromanians, Megleno-Romanians, Istro-Romanians and related Balkan Latin peoples (Vlachs) between the 6-7th centuries AD and the 10th or 11th centuries AD. The Romanian language, the Aromanian language, the Megleno-Romanian language, and the Istro-Romanian language all share language innovations rooted in Vulgar Latin, and as a group they are all distinct from the other Romance languages.

== History ==
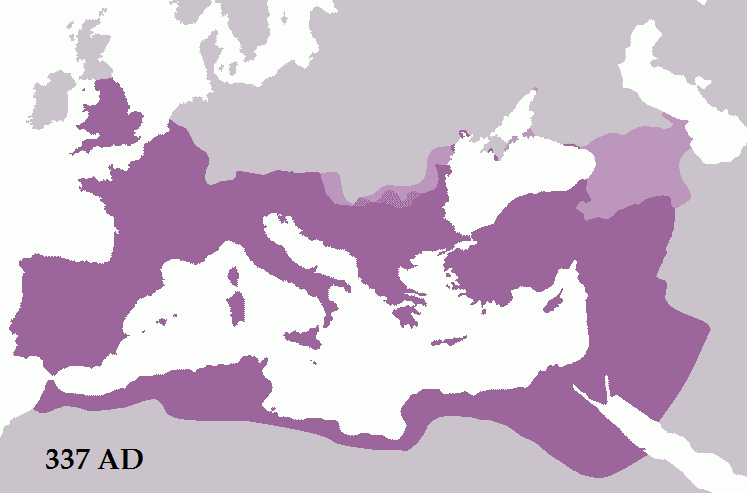
The Roman Empire in 337 AD after the conquests of emperor Constantine the Great. Roman territory is dark purple, Constantine's conquests in Dacia are shaded dark purple, and Roman dependencies are light purple.

The Roman occupation led to a Thraco-Roman syncretism, and similar to the case of other conquered civilisations (see, for example, how Gallo-Roman culture developed in Roman Gaul) led to the Latinization of many Thracian tribes which were on the edge of the sphere of Latin influence, eventually resulting in the possible extinction of the Daco-Thracian language, but traces of it are still preserved in the Eastern Romance substratum. From the 2nd century AD, the Latin spoken in the Danubian provinces starts to display its own distinctive features, separate from the rest of the Romance languages, including those of the western Balkans (Dalmatian). The Thraco-Roman period of the language is usually delimited between the 2nd century (or earlier via cultural influence and economic ties) and the 6th or the 7th century. It is divided, in turn, into two periods, with the division falling roughly in the 3rd to 4th century. The Romanian Academy considers the 5th century as the latest time that the differences between Balkan Latin and western Latin could have appeared, and that between the 5th and 8th centuries, the new language, Romanian, switched from Latin speech, to a vernacular Romance idiom, called Română comună. The nature of the contact between Latin and the substrate language(s) is considered to be similar to the contact with local languages in other parts incorporated in the Roman Empire and the number of lexical and morpho-syntactic elements retained from the substrate is relatively small despite some ongoing contact with languages closely related to the original substrate, Albanian for example.

In the ninth century, Proto-Romanian already had a structure very distinct from the other Romance languages, with major differences in grammar, morphology and phonology and already was a member of the Balkan language area. It already contained around a hundred loans from Slavic languages, including words such as trup (body, flesh), as well as some Greek language loans via Vulgar Latin, but no Hungarian and Turkish words, as these peoples had yet to arrive in the region.

In the tenth century or some earlier time, Common Romanian split into two geographically separated groups. One was in the northern part of the Balkan peninsula and the other one was in the south of the peninsula where the Aromanian branch of Common Romanian presumably was spoken. This is sometimes considered the upper end of the language, leading into the separate Eastern Romance languages period. A different view holds that Common Romanian, despite the early split of Aromanian, continued to exist until the thirteenth or fourteenth century when all the southern dialects became distinct from the northern one.

According to the theory, it evolved into the following modern languages and their dialects:

- Romanian language (sometimes called Daco-Romanian to distinguish it from the rest of the Eastern Romance languages)
- Aromanian (sometimes called Macedo-Romanian)
- Megleno-Romanian (also sometimes called Macedo-Romanian)
- Istro-Romanian

== Early attestation ==
Referring to this time period, of great debate and interest is the case of the phrase torna, torna, fratre. In Theophylact Simocatta's Histories, (c. 630), the author mentions the words τóρνα, τóρνα. The context of this mention is a Byzantine expedition during Maurice's Balkan campaigns in 587, led by general Comentiolus, in the Haemus, against the Pannonian Avars. The success of the campaign was compromised by an incident during a night march. Nearly two centuries after Theophylactus, the same episode is retold by another Byzantine chronicler, Theophanes the Confessor, in his Chronographia (c. 810–814). He mentions the words τόρνα, τόρνα, φράτρε [torna, torna fratre; "turn, turn brother"].

A multitude of scholars have identified the phrase as a sample of early Romanian.

== Development ==
=== From Latin ===
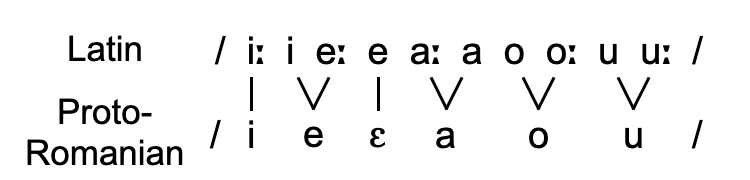
The main stressed vowel developments from Latin to Common Romanian.

The comparative analysis of Romance languages shows that certain changes that occurred from Latin to Common Romanian are particular to it or shared only with a limited number of other Romance languages. Some of these changes are:

- reorganization of the Latin vowel system - Common Romanian followed a mixed scheme, with the back vowels o, u following the Sardinian scheme but the front vowels e, i following the Western Romance scheme. This produces a six-vowel system (contrast the Sardinian five-vowel system and Western Romance seven-vowel system).
- resistance to palatalization:
  - the palatalization of /tj kj/, which appeared as early as the 2nd–3rd centuries AD, resulted in /ttj/ or /tj/ in intervocalic position and as /tj/ in word-initial position or after a consonant, without giving rise to a new phoneme.
  - the palatalization before a front vowel (/k ɡ/ before /i e ɛ/), dated around the fifth century in general, did not occur around this time in Common Romanian (and Dalmatian), and took place after the delabialization of /kw/ /ɡw/ ([*sandʒe] < sanguem), the degemination of nn, ll, rr, and the diphthongization of Proto-Romance /ɛ/ to [jɛ].
- the surviving au diphthong was retained and later underwent diaeresis.
- resistance to syncope - Common Romanian kept all the syllables from the Latin word.
- absence of lenition - it retained the intervocalic stops intact. It also showed greater resistance to /ɡ/ deletion.

==== Common features to the four languages ====
Collectively described as languages of the Eastern Romance subgroup from a synchronic, contemporary perspective Romanian, Aromanian, Megleno-Romanian, and Istro-Romanian are descendants of the same proto-language from a historical, diachronic point of view.

Of the features that are found in all four dialects, inherited from Latin or subsequently developed, of particular importance are:

- appearance of the mid central vowel /ə/ (written as "ă" in standardized Romanian);
- growth of the plural inflectional ending -uri for the neuter gender;
- analytic present conditional (ex: Daco-Romanian aș cânta);
- analytic future with an auxiliary derived from Latin volo (ex: Aromanian va s-cãntu);
- enclisis of the definite article (ex: Istro-Romanian câre – cârele);
- nominal declension with two case forms in the singular feminine.

Comparatively, the dialects show a large number of loanwords from Slavic languages, including loanwords from Slavic languages spoken before the 9th century, at the stage before Aromanian, Daco-Romanian, and Megleno-Romanian separated. Of these words a few examples are:

- *bōrzdà (Aromanian: brazdã, Daco-Romanian: brazdă, Istro-Romanian: bråzda, Megleno-Romanian: brazdă);
- *nevěsta (Aromanian: niveastã, Daco-Romanian: nevastă, Istro-Romanian: nevęstę, Megleno-Romanian: niveastă);
- *sìto (Aromanian: sitã, Daco-Romanian: sită, Istro-Romanian: sitę, Megleno-Romanian: sită);
- *slàbъ (Aromanian: s(c)lab, Daco-Romanian: slab, Istro-Romanian: slåb, Megleno-Romanian: slab).

Substrate words are preserved at different levels in the four dialects. Daco-Romanian has 89, Aromanian 66. Megleno-Romanian 48, and Istro-Romanian 25.

== See also ==
- Vulgar Latin
- Daco-Roman
- Thraco-Roman
- History of Romanian
- Proto-Romance language
- Albanian–Eastern Romance linguistic parallels
