= Eastern Romance languages =

Romance subfamily of Southeast Europe

Eastern Romance
- Geographic distribution: Southeast Europe; Eastern Europe
- Ethnicity: Romanians, Moldovans, Aromanians, Megleno-Romanians, Istro-Romanians
- Linguistic classification: Indo-European: Italic; Latino-Faliscan; Latin; Romance; Eastern Romance
- Early forms: Old Latin: Vulgar Latin; Proto-Romance; Common Romanian
- Subdivisions: Daco-Romanian (Romanian); Aromanian; Megleno-Romanian; Istro-Romanian

Language codes
- Glottolog: east2714 Eastern Romance
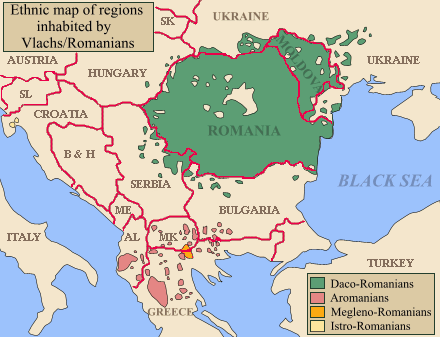
- Geographic distribution of present-day Eastern Romance-speakers

The Eastern Romance languages are a group of Romance languages. The group comprises the Romanian language (Daco-Romanian), the Aromanian language and two other related minor languages, Megleno-Romanian and Istro-Romanian.

The extinct Dalmatian language (otherwise included in the Central Romance group) is sometimes included as part of the Eastern Romance group, being considered a bridge between Italian and Romanian. Some classifications of the Romance languages consider Eastern and Central Romance to form a clade (often simply called "Eastern Romance", with "Eastern Romance proper" referred to as Daco-Romance or Balkan/Hemus Romance), but nowadays Central Romance are more often grouped with the Western Romance languages as "Italo-Western".

== Languages ==
Eastern Romance comprises Romanian (or Daco-Romanian), Aromanian, Megleno-Romanian and Istro-Romanian, according to the most widely accepted classification of the Romance languages. The four languages are sometimes labelled as dialects of Romanian and developed from a common ancestor known as Common Romanian. They are surrounded by non-Romance languages. Judaeo-Spanish (or Ladino) is also spoken in the Balkan Peninsula, but it is rarely listed among the other Romance languages of the region because it is rather an Iberian Romance language that developed as a Jewish dialect of Old Spanish in the far west of Europe, and it began to be spoken widely in the Balkans only after the influx of Ladino-speaking refugees into the Ottoman Empire in the 16th century.

=== Internal classification ===
Within the Glottolog database, the languages are classified as follows:

- Eastern Romance
  - Aromanian
  - Northern Romanian
    - Eastern Romanian
      - Megleno-Romanian
      - Daco-Romanian
    - Istro-Romanian

Peter R. Petrucci, by contrast, states that Common Romanian had developed into two major dialects by the 10th century, and that Daco-Romanian and Istro-Romanian are descended from the northern dialect, while Megleno-Romanian and Aromanian are descended from the southern dialect.

- Eastern Romance
  - Northern Romanian
    - Daco-Romanian
    - Istro-Romanian
  - Southern Romanian
    - Aromanian
    - Megleno-Romanian

== Samples of Eastern Romance languages ==
Note: the lexicon used below is not universally recognized.

Istro-Romanian	Aromanian	Megleno-Romanian	Romanian	Italian	Spanish	Portuguese	French	Latin source	English
pićor	cicior	picior	picior	gamba	(pierna)	perna	jambe	petiolus/gamba	leg
kľeptu	cheptu	kľeptu	piept	petto	pecho	peito	poitrine	pectus	chest
bire	ghine	bini	bine	bene	bien	bem	bien	bene	well, good
bľerå	azghirari	zber	zbiera/a rage	ruggire	rugir	rugir	rugir	bēlāre/rugīre	to roar
fiľu	hilj	iľu	fiu	figlio	hijo	filho	fils	filius	son
fiľa	hilje	iľe	fiică	figlia	hija	filha	fille	fīlia	daughter
ficåt	hicat		ficat	fegato	hígado	fígado	foie	fīcātum	liver
fi	hire	ire	a fi	essere	ser	ser	être	fuī/esse/sum	to be
fľer	heru	ieru	fier	ferro	hierro	ferro	fer	ferrum	iron
vițelu	yitsãl	vițål	vițel	vitello	(ternero)	vitelo	veau	vitellus	calf
(g)ľerm	iermu	ghiarmi	vierme	verme	verme (gusano)	verme	ver	vermis	worm
viu	yiu	ghiu	viu	vivo	vivo	vivo	vif/vivant	vīvus/vīvēns	alive
vipt	yiptu		vipt	cibo (vitto)	comida (victo)	comida (vitualha)	victuaille (archaic)	victus	food, grain, victuals
mľe(lu)	njel	m'iel	miel	agnello	(cordero), añal (archaic)	anho, cordeiro	agneau	agnellus	lamb
mľåre	njare	m'ari	miere	miele	miel	mel	miel	mel	honey

== See also ==
- Balkan sprachbund
- Common Romanian
- Eastern Romance influence on Slavic languages
- Substrate in Romanian

== Sources ==
- Agard, Frederick Browning (1984). A Course in Romance Linguistics Volume 2: A Diachronic View. Georgetown University Press. ISBN 0-87840-074-5.
- Hall, Robert A. Jr. (1950). "The Reconstruction of Proto-Romance". Language. 26 (1). Linguistic Society of America: 6–27. doi:10.2307/410406. JSTOR 410406.
- Harris, Martin (1997). Harris, Martin; Vincent, Nigel (eds.). The Romance Languages. Taylor & Francis. pp. 1–25. ISBN 978-0-415-16417-7.
- Hammarström, Harald; Forkel, Robert; Haspelmath, Martin (2019). "Catalogue of languages and families". Jena: Max Planck Institute for the Science of Human History. Archived from the original on 2020-05-02.
- Posner, Rebecca (1996). The Romance Languages. Cambridge University Press. ISBN 978-0-52-128139-3.
- Sampson, Rodney (1999). Nasal Vowel Evolution in Romance. Oxford University Press. ISBN 978-0-19-823848-5.
- Schulte, Kim (2009). "Loanwords in Romanian". In Haspelmath, Martin; Tadmor, Uri (eds.). Loanwords in the World's Languages: A Comparative Handbook. De Gruyter Mouton. pp. 230–259. ISBN 978-3-11-021843-5.
- Swiggers, Pierre (2011). "Mapping the Romance Languages of Europe". In Lameli, Alfred; Kehrein, Roland; Rabanus, Stefan (eds.). Language Mapping: Part I. Part II: Maps. De Gruyter Mouton. pp. 269–301. ISBN 978-3-11-021916-6.
- Harris, Martin (1988). Harris, Martin; Vincent, Nigel (eds.). The Romance Languages. Oxford University Press. pp. 1–25. ISBN 978-0-19-520829-0.
- Lindstedt, Jouko (2014). "Balkan Slavic and Balkan Romance: from congruence to convergence". In Besters-Dilger, Juliane; Dermarkar, Cynthia; Pfänder, Stefan; Rabus, Achim (eds.). Congruence in Contact-Induced Language Change: Language Families, Typological Resemblance, and Perceived Similarity. Walter de Gruyter. pp. 168–183. ISBN 978-3-11-033834-8.
- Maiden, Martin (2016). "Romanian, Istro–Romanian, Megleno–Romanian, and Arumanian". In Ledgeway, Adam; Maiden, Martin (eds.). The Oxford Guide to the Romance Languages. Oxford University Press. pp. 91–125. ISBN 978-0-19-967710-8.
- Mallinson, Graham (1988). "Rumanian". In Harris, Martin; Vincent, Nigel (eds.). The Romance Languages. Oxford University Press. pp. 391–419. ISBN 978-0-19-520829-0.
- Sala, Marius (2012). De la Latină la Română] [From Latin to Romanian]. Editura Pro Universitaria. p. 33. ISBN 978-606-647-435-1.
- Petrucci, Peter R. (1999). Slavic Features in the History of Rumanian. München: LINCOM Europa. ISBN 38-9586-599-0.
