= Jireček Line =

Conceptual boundary between ancient Greek and Latin influences in the Balkans

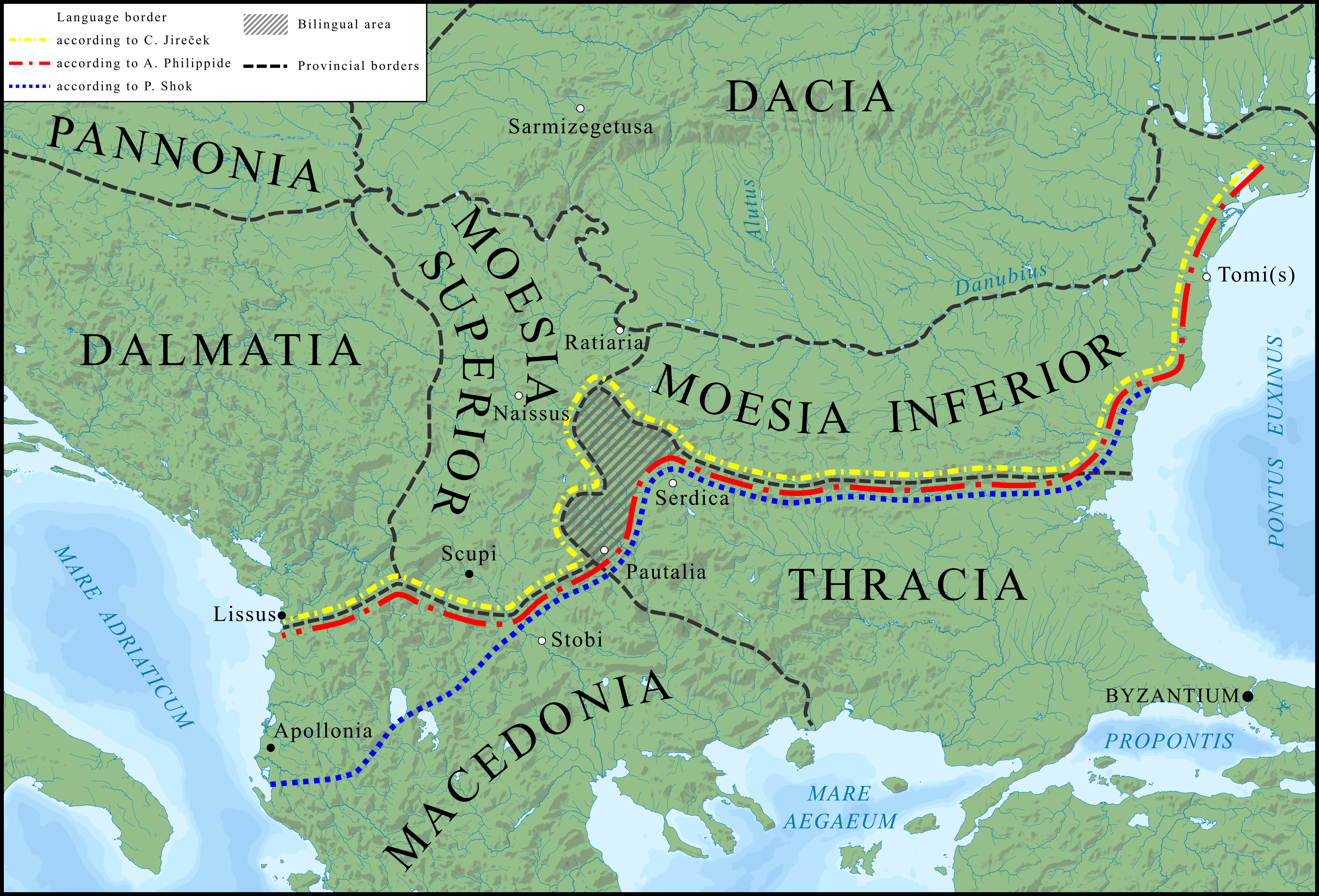
The language border between Latin- and Greek-influenced regions of the Roman Empire according to various linguists

The Jireček Line is a conceptual boundary through the ancient Balkans that divides the influence of the Latin (in the north) and Greek (in the south) languages in the Roman Empire from antiquity to the 4th century. The border has been corrected repeatedly by the discovery of new inscriptions. A possible rough outline of it goes from near Lissus (near Lezhë and Laç in modern Albania) to Serdica (now Sofia, in Bulgaria) and then follows the Balkan Mountains to Odessus (Varna) on the Black Sea or continuing along the coastline northwards to the Danube Delta.

== History ==
This line is important for establishing the area where the Romanian, Aromanian, Megleno-Romanian and Albanian people formed (see Origin of the Romanians and Origin of the Albanians). It was used originally by Czech historian Konstantin Jireček in 1911 in a history of the Slavic people.

The placement of the line is based on archaeological findings. Most of the inscriptions found to the north of it are written in Latin, and most of the inscriptions found to the south of it are in Greek.

== Purpose ==
The boundary, in its various forms, is theoretical. Already during antiquity there were significant exceptions since there were hellenized groups north of the line like the Greek colonies along the western coastline of the Black Sea, and latinized groups may have lived south of the line. Even so, it is a useful but approximate instrument to determine the influence to which a certain area was predominantly exposed.

More recent scholars have revised it somewhat. Kaimio (1979) assigns Dalmatia and Moesia Superior to the Latin area and Moesia Inferior in the Greek sphere. MacLeod (1982) suggests that there may not have been "an official language policy for each and every aspect of life", but that "individual Roman officials [made] common sense ad hoc decisions". He also states that during the pre-Byzantine Roman period, "even in Greek areas... Latin was the dominant language in inscriptions recording public works, on milestones and in the army".

== See also ==
- Greek East and Latin West
- Daco-Roman
- Thraco-Roman
- History of Romanian
- Romanian language
- Albanian–Eastern Romance linguistic parallels
