= Grigore Brâncuș =

Romanian linguist and philologist (1929–2022)

Grigore Brâncuș (20 March 1929, Peștișani, Romania – 2 April 2022, Bucharest) was a Romanian linguist and philologist, Albanologist, member of the Romanian Academy.

== Activity ==
Brâncuș completed his university studies at the Faculty of Philology of the University of Bucharest in 1953, the same University where he would continue his academic activity and became a university teacher at 21 years old, for nearly half a century (1950-1999). For 18 years he was the head of the Department of Romanian Language. Brâncuș completed his PhD in Historical Linguistics and Balkanology under the supervision of Alexandru Rosetti and was known for his research in the interlinguistic relations between Albanian and Romanian.

In 2017, he was awarded the Order of the Star of Romania, Knight rank.

== Selected works ==
- “B. P. Hasdeu, lingvist și filolog” (1968);
- “Limba română contemporană. Morfologia verbului” (1976)
- “Limba română. Modele de analiză gramaticală” (1996);
- “Gramatica limbii române. Morfologia, în colaborare” (1998);
- „Introducere în istoria limbii române” (2002);
- “Istoria cuvintelor. Unitate de limbă și cultură românească” (2004);
- “Studii de istorie a limbii române” (2007);
- “Expresie populară în ciclul „La Lilieci” de Marin Sorescu” (2014).
