= Marius Sala =

Romanian linguist (1932–2018)

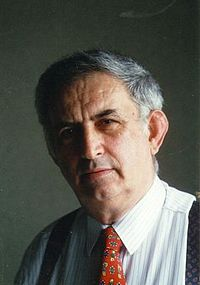
- Born: Marius Sala; September 8, 1932; Vașcău, Kingdom of Romania
- Died: August 19, 2018 (aged 85); Bucharest, Romania
- Occupation: Professor

Academic background
- Education: University of Bucharest

Academic work
- Discipline: Linguistics
- Institutions: University of Bucharest

Marius Sala (September 8, 1932, Vașcău, Romania – August 19, 2018, Bucharest) was a Romanian linguist, member of the Romanian Academy. His activity gained international academic recognition in the study of Romance languages.

== Professional activity ==
Marius Sala received his PhD. in Philology in 1967 with the thesis "The Phonetics and Phonology of Judeo-Spanish" at University of Bucharest. He started his work in 1953 as a researcher at Romanian Academy's Institute of Linguistics "Iorgu Iordan–Al. Rosetti", an institution he presided from 1994 until 2017. Along with being a full member of Romanian Academy (corresponding member from 1994 until 2001), he was also its vice-president from 2006 until 2014. Other institutions he was corresponding member: Real Academia Española (1978), Instituto Mexicano de Cultura (1981), Academia Nacional de Letras from Uruguay (1994), and Academia Peruana de la Lengua (2004).

From 1990 he was the president of the Romanian Branch of Latin Union.

He contributed to 11 articles to the Encyclopædia Britannica and collaborated with Cambridge University Press in the study of Romance languages.

== Notable awards ==
- National Order of Faithful Service – Romania, Commander (2000), later Grand Officer (2009)
- Order of the Star of Italian Solidarity (2004)
- Order of the Crown – Belgium (2008)

== Selected works ==
- Contributions to the historic phonetics of the Romanian language, Bucharest, 1970;
- Phonétique et phonologie du judéo-espagnol de Bucarest, Hague, 1971;
- El léxico indígena del español de América. Apreciaciones sobre su vitalidad (collaborator), Mexico, 1977;
- The encyclopedia of Romance languages, Bucharest, 1989;
- Languages in contact, Bucharest, 1997;
- From Latin to Romanian, Bucharest, 1998;
- May we introduce the Romanian Language to you? (collaborator), Bucharest, 2000;
- 101 cuvinte moștenite, împrumutate și create, Bucharest, 2010
- Dicționarul Limbii Române (editor-in-chief).
