= Maramureș dialect =

Dialect of the Romanian language

The Maramureș dialect (subdialectul/graiul maramureșean) is one of the dialects of the Romanian language (Daco-Romanian). Its geographic distribution covers approximately the historical region of Maramureș, now split between Romania and Ukraine.

== Classification ==
The Maramureș dialect belongs to the group of relatively fragmented Transylvanian varieties, along with the Crișana dialect. This places the Maramureș dialect in the northern group of Romanian dialects, which also includes Moldavian dialect and Banat, as opposed to the southern grouping which consists of the Wallachian subdialect alone.

In the context of the transition-like and very fragmented speech varieties of Transylvania, the classification of the Maramureș dialect as a separate variety is made difficult—like the Crișana dialect, or even more so—by the small number of distinctive phonetic features. This difficulty made many researchers, in particular in earlier stages of the dialectal studies of Romanian, to not recognize an individual Maramureș dialect; this view was held by Gustav Weigand, Alexandru Philippide, Iorgu Iordan, and Emanuel Vasiliu among others. Subsequent analyses admit the existence of this variety, albeit with some reluctance, leading some researchers (such as Emil Petrovici and Sextil Pușcariu) to elaborate different classifications according to different criteria, depending on which the Maramureș variety is or is not individualized. Current classifications, owed to Romulus Todoran, Ion Coteanu and others, recognize a separate Maramureș dialect.

== Geographic distribution ==
The Maramureș dialect is spoken in the approximate area of the Maramureș historical region, including parts of both Romania and Ukraine. In Romania, the dialectal area covers the north-eastern part of the Maramureș County, along the valleys of the Tisza, Vișeu, Mara, and Cosău; many people are concentrated in Sighetu Marmației, Vișeu and Borșa. In Ukraine, speakers are found in the eastern part of the Zakarpattia Oblast (Northern Maramureș); their number is decreasing.

== Subdivisions ==
Although spoken on a small area, the Maramureș dialect can be further divided, by using particularities that are mostly lexical, into three branches:

- a wide central part of the area, which is the most representative;
- the north-western part has influences from the variety spoken in the Oaș Country;
- the south-eastern part.

== Particularities ==
Many particularities are shared with the Crișana dialect as well as with the other neighboring Transylvanian varieties, and some with the Moldavian dialect.

=== Phonetic features ===
- Mid vowels [e, ə, o] close to [i, ɨ, u], respectively, or to intermediate positions. The most frequent is the change of [e] to [i̞]: [di̞, di̞ la] for standard de, de la.
- When [e] appears in two consecutive syllables, the first [e] opens to [ɛ]: [ˈfɛte] (standard fete [ˈfete]).
- The diphthong [o̯a] monophthongizes to [ɔ]: [uˈʃɔrə, ˈnɔptʲe] for standard ușoară [uˈʃo̯arə], noapte [ˈno̯apte].
- After the consonants [s, z, ʃ, ʒ, t͡s, d͡z, r] front vowels become central, whereas the diphthong [e̯a] monophthongizes to [a]: [ˈsɨŋɡur, ˈsarə, ˈzamə, ʒɨr, t͡sɨn, d͡zɨ] for standard singur, seară, zeamă, jir, țin, zi.
- Consonants [t͡ʃ, d͡ʒ] are less palatal than in the standard language and have the effect of centralizing a following [e] to [ə]: [t͡ʃər, d͡ʒər] for standard cer, ger.
- After labials, [e] becomes [ə] and the diphthong [e̯a] is monophthongized to [a]: [mərɡ, ˈmarɡə, pə] for standard merg, meargă, pe.
- The stressed diphthong [e̯a] monophthongizes to [ɛ] in word-final positions: [aˈvɛ, vrɛ] for standard avea, vrea.
- The diphthong [ja] becomes [je] in certain words: [bəˈjet, muˈjet] for standard băiat, muiat.
- Devocalized [i, u] are found in word-final positions: [pəkuˈrarʲ, ˈt͡ʃərʲʷ] for standard păcurar, cer.
- The diphthong [ɨj] monophthongizes to [ɨ]: [ˈkɨnʲe, ˈmɨnʲe, ˈpɨnʲe] for standard câine, mâine, pâine.
- Etymologic [ɨ] is preserved in words like îmblu, îmflu, întru (standard umblu, umflu, intru).
- Archaic [d͡z, d͡ʒ] are preserved in words like [d͡zɨk, d͡ʒos, d͡ʒok] (compare with standard [zik, ʒos, ʒok]).
- The consonants [l, n] are palatalized when followed by front vowels: [ˈlʲemnʲe, ˈvinʲe] for lemne, vine.
- The palatalization of labials before front vowels takes specific forms:
  - [p] becomes [ptʲ]: [ˈptʲelʲe] for standard piele;
  - [b] becomes [bdʲ]: [ˈbdʲinʲe] for standard bine;
  - [m] becomes [mnʲ]: [mnʲik] for standard mic;
  - [f] becomes [s]: [sə ˈsije] for standard să fie;
  - [v] becomes [z]: [ˈzjerme] for standard vierme.

=== Morphological and syntactical features ===
- The possessive article is invariable: a meu, a mea, a mei, a mele ("mine", compare with standard al meu, a mea, ai mei, ale mele).
- The proximal demonstrative pronouns are closer to their Latin etymons: aista, aiasta.
- Some verbs of the 1st and 4th conjugation groups do not take the -ez and -esc suffixes: lucră, mă rușin, străluce ("he works", "I feel shy", "it shines", compare with standard lucrează, mă rușinez, strălucește). On the other hand, the suffix -esc does sometimes occur in verbs conjugated without it in the standard language: împărțăsc, omorăsc, simțăsc ("I divide", "I kill", "I feel", compare with standard împart, omor, simt).
- Certain verb forms have [n] replaced with other sounds: [spuj, viw, viˈind] ("I say", "I come", "coming", compare with standard spun, vin, venind). This feature is shared with the Wallachian dialect.
- The auxiliary used for the compound perfect of verbs in the 3rd person is o for the singular and or / o for the plural: [o d͡zɨs, or d͡zɨs] ("he said", "they said", compare with standard a zis, au zis).
- The following forms occur for the 3rd person of the subjunctive, both singular and plural: să deie, să steie, să beie, să vreie, ending in [ˈeje], where the standard language has să dea, să stea, să bea, să vrea, ending in [ˈe̯a].
- The pluperfect can also be built analytically: m-am fost dus, am fost venit ("I had gone", "I had come", compare with the standard syntactic forms mă dusesem, venisem).
- Verbs a aduce "to bring" and a veni "to come" have particular imperative forms: adă, vină (standard adu, vino).
- There is a general tendency toward shorting the words: o fo (standard a fost), Gheo (instead of Gheorghe, a male first name), etc.

=== Lexical particularities ===
- Specific words: a cușăi ("to taste", standard a gusta), cocon ("child", standard copil), pup ("flower bud", standard boboc), potică ("drugstore", standard farmacie), zierme ("snake", standard șarpe).

=== Sample ===
Maramureș dialect: [sə ˈrɔɡə lu dumnʲeˈd͡zəw ɨʃ ˈfat͡ʃə ˈkrut͡ʃə ʃɨ ˈd͡zɨt͡ʃə ‖ ˈdɔmnʲe aˈd͡ʒutəm ‖ ʃɨ feˈmɛja jɛ ũ wow ʃɨl ˈspard͡ʒə dʲe kar ka səj sije uˈʃɔrə arəˈtura ka ʃɨ wowu]

Standard Romanian: Se roagă lui Dumnezeu, își face cruce și zice: Doamne, ajută-mi. Și femeia ia un ou și-l sparge de car, ca să-i fie ușoară arătura, ca și oul.

English translation: "She prays to God, she crosses herself, and says: God, help me. And the woman takes an egg and breaks it on the cart, so that the plowing will be light [easy] like the egg."

== Bibliography ==
- Ilona Bădescu, "Dialectologie", teaching material for the University of Craiova (in Romanian)
- Vasile Ursan, "Despre configurația dialectală a dacoromânei actuale", Transilvania (new series), 2008, No. 1, pp. 77–85 (in Romanian)
- Elena Buja, Liliana Coposescu, Gabriela Cusen, Luiza Meseșan Schmitz, Dan Chiribucă, Adriana Neagu, Iulian Pah, Raport de țară: România, country report for the Lifelong Learning Programme MERIDIUM (in Romanian)

== See also ==
- Romanian phonology
