= Transylvanian Romanian =

Dialects of the Romanian language

Transylvanian Romanian (subdialectele / graiurile ardelene) refers to a group of dialects of the Romanian language (Daco-Romanian). These varieties cover the historical region of Transylvania, except several large areas along the edges towards the neighboring dialects.

The Transylvanian varieties are part of the northern group of Romanian dialects, along with Moldavian and Banat.

Among the Transylvanian varieties, the Crișana dialect is easier to distinguish, followed by the Maramureș dialect. Less distinct are two other dialectal areas, one in the northeast and another in the center and south.

== Classification ==
Unlike the other Romanian dialects, those of Wallachia, Moldavia, and Banat, the Romanian of Transylvania is broken up into many smaller and less distinct local speech varieties, making its dialectal classification more difficult. Classifications made until the late 19th century included a Transylvanian dialect, but as soon as detailed language facts became available, in the early 20th century, that view was abandoned. In 1908, Gustav Weigand used phonetic differences and reached the conclusion that the Romanian in Transylvania was a mosaic of transition varieties. Subsequent researchers agreed with his view.

Emil Petrovici suggested that dialectal fragmentation could be attributed to the fact that Transylvania has been inhabited for more time and so differentiated and split into small dialectal cells, which were determined by geography. However, Moldavia and Wallachia were relatively recently colonized, which led to a remarkable dialectal unity in both regions.

== Phonetic features ==
As a group, all Transylvanian varieties share a small number of common phonetic features:

- The stressed vowels [e, ə, o] open to [ɛ, ɜ, ɔ].
- After [s, z, t͡s] and, in some varieties also after [ʃ, ʒ, r], the following vocalic changes occur: [e] becomes [ə], [i] becomes [ɨ], and [e̯a] reduces to [a].
- The diphthong [ɨj] found in the Wallachian dialect is realised as the monophthong [ɨ]: [ˈkɨne, ˈmɨne, ˈpɨne] for câne, mâne, pâne.
- Stressed vowels tend to be pronounced longer.
- The vowel [a] before a stressed syllable closes to [ə].
- In a series of verbs, the stress shifts to the root: [ˈblastəm, ɨnˈfəʃur, ˈstrəkur, ˈməsur] for standard blestèm, înfășèr, strecòr, măsòr.
- The vowel [u] is found in the full paradigm of the verbs a durmi, a adùrmi ("to sleep, to fall asleep", compare with standard a dormi, a adormi).

== See also ==
- Romanian phonology

== Bibliography ==
- Vasile Ursan, "Despre configurația dialectală a dacoromânei actuale", Transilvania (new series), 2008, No. 1, pp. 77–85 (in Romanian)
- Ilona Bădescu, "Dialectologie", teaching material for the University of Craiova.
