= Banat dialect =

Banat dialect may refer to:

- Banat Bulgarian dialect
- Banat Romanian dialect
