= Wallachian dialect =

Dialect of Romanian language

The Wallachian or Muntenian dialect (subdialectul/graiul muntean/muntenesc) is one of the several dialects of the Romanian language (Daco-Romanian). Its geographic distribution covers approximately the historical region of Wallachia, occupying the southern part of Romania, roughly between the Danube and the Southern Carpathians. Standard Romanian, in particular its phonology, is largely based on Wallachian.

As with all other Romanian dialects, Wallachian is distinguished primarily by its phonetic characteristics and only marginally by morphological, syntactical, and lexical features.

The Wallachian dialect is the only member of the southern grouping of Romanian dialects. All the other dialects and speech varieties are classified in the northern grouping, whose most typical representative is the Moldavian dialect.

The Wallachian and the Moldavian dialects are the only two that have been consistently identified and recognized by linguists. They are clearly distinguished in dialect classifications made by Heimann Tiktin, Mozes Gaster, Gustav Weigand, Sextil Pușcariu, Sever Pop, Emil Petrovici, Romulus Todoran, Ion Coteanu, Alexandru Philippide, Iorgu Iordan, Emanuel Vasiliu, and others, whereas the other dialects and speech varieties have proven to be considerably more controversial and difficult to classify.

== Geographic distribution ==
The Wallachian dialect is spoken in the southern part of Romania, in the region of Wallachia. More accurately, it covers the following counties:

- in Muntenia (Muntenian dialect, but in Teleorman there is a little influence from Oltenian dialect): Argeș (which also has an Oltenian influence), Brăila (mostly in southern half and central also spoken in north but with some Moldavian influences), Buzău (mostly in southern half and central also spoken in north but with some Moldavian influences), Călărași, Dâmbovița, Giurgiu, Ialomița, Ilfov and Bucharest, Prahova, Teleorman;
- in Oltenia (Oltenian dialect): Dolj, Gorj (eastern part), Mehedinți (mostly eastern part, not in Banat), Olt, Vâlcea;
- in Northern Dobruja (Dobrujan dialect who has some Muntenian influence but many Moesic words from their heritage): Constanța and the southern half of the Tulcea County (in the northern half the Moldavian dialect is spoken).
- in southern Transylvania (in fact Transylvanian dialect but with a group influence from Muntenian): Brașov and the southern part of the Sibiu County.
- in the Timok Valley (Serbia and Bulgaria) by part of the Timok Vlachs. The other part speaks the Banat dialect.

The most typical features of the Wallachian dialect are found in the central part of this area, specifically in the following counties: Argeș, Călărași, Dâmbovița, Giurgiu, Ialomița, Olt, and Teleorman.

== Influences from the neighboring areas ==
The dialects spoken in the neighboring areas have influenced the Wallachian dialect, thus creating transition speech varieties, as follows:

- in the northeastern edge there is an influence from the Moldavian dialect;
- in the northern area, across the southern Carpathian mountains, influences from the central and southern Transylvanian speech varieties are found;
- in the northwestern part, influences are felt from the Banat dialect and the Hațeg Land speech varieties.

== Subdivisions ==
Some researchers further divide the Wallachian dialect into finer speech varieties. This division, however, can no longer rely on clear and systematic phonetic features, but on morphological, syntactical, and lexical differences.

For instance, Sextil Pușcariu and others consider a separate speech variety in Oltenia. This has very few distinct features – such as the extensive use of the simple perfect tense – and is most often considered a transition speech variety from the Wallachian to the Banat dialect.

Even less distinct is the particular speech variety of Dobruja. This too is often considered a transition variety, between the Wallachian and the Moldavian dialects.

== Particularities ==
=== Phonetic features ===
The Wallachian dialect has the following phonetic particularities that contrast it with the other dialects and varieties. Many of these phonetic features are also found in the pronunciation of Standard Romanian.

- The postalveolars [t͡ʃ, d͡ʒ] are preserved: [t͡ʃiˈreʃe, ˈd͡ʒemete].
- Contrast is made between the affricate [d͡ʒ] and the fricative [ʒ].
- Except in Oltenia, after the dentals [s, z, t͡s], the vowels [e, i] and the diphthong [e̯a] are preserved: [semn, siŋɡur, ˈse̯arə, zer, zid, ˈze̯amə, t͡ses, t͡siw, ˈt͡se̯apə]. This occurs simultaneously with a slight palatalization of those dentals.
- After the fricatives [ʃ, ʒ] and after [r], the vowel [ə] changes to [e]: [ˈuʃe, ˈstraʒe, t͡siˈɡare]. The two fricatives are pronounced slightly palatalized.
- The diphthong [o̯a] is preserved: [ˈdo̯are ˈko̯aʒe].
- The diphthong [e̯a] in old Romanian becomes [e] in certain phonetic contexts: [ˈled͡ʒe ˈmese ˈsemne]. (It remains [e̯a] when it is followed by a consonant or a consonant cluster and then by [ə], as in [ˈle̯aɡə ˈkre̯at͡sə].)
- The front vowel ending is anticipated by inserting [j] in the words [ˈkɨjne ˈmɨjne ˈpɨjne].
- The labials [p b f v] remain unchanged before front vowels and [j]: [piˈt͡ʃor alˈbinə ˈfjerbe ˈvitə]. In some areas of Wallachian, palatalized labials can be found today, but these appeared as a consequence of recent population migrations.
- The dentals [t d n] do not change before front vowels and glides: [ˈkarte ˈte̯amə de̯al dimiˈne̯at͡sə].
- A devocalized [u] is found at the end of some words: [omʷ, pomʷ] for om, pom.
- In word-initial position sometimes [h] is pronounced weakly or completely removed: [ˈajnə, wot͡s] for haină, hoț. Hypercorrection sometimes leads to adding a word-initial [h]: [ˈharipə, ˈhale̯a, ˈhalbij] for aripă, alea, albii.
- In Muntenia, after [d] and [p], [e] is replaced with [ə] and [i] with [ɨ] in prepositions and prefixes: [də, dəˈkɨt, dəstuˈpat, dəsˈpart, dəʃˈkid, ˈdɨntre, pə] for standard de, decât, destupat, despart, deschid, dintre, pe.
- In north-eastern and eastern Muntenia, labials followed by front sounds are palatalized: [ˈpʰʲjele, ˈbʰʲine, fʰʲjer, vʰʲin, ˈmʲjere] for piele, bine, fier, vin, miere.
- In Oltenia, like in the Banat dialect, after the fricatives [s, z, ʃ, ʒ] and the affricate [t͡s], [e] becomes [ə], [i] becomes [ɨ], and [e̯a] reduces to [a]: [ˈsarə, səˈkure, ˈsɨŋɡur, zɨk, zər, ˈzamə, ʒɨr, t͡sapə, t͡sɨw, t͡səˈpuʃ] for seară, secure, singur, zic, zer, zeamă, jir, țeapă, țin, țepușă.
- In Oltenia, [j] is inserted before [k] when this is palatalized or followed by a front vowel: [wojkʲ, rajˈkiw, ˈstrajkinə] for standard ochi, rachiu, strachină.
- In southern Oltenia, a particular type of palatalization occurs when labial fricatives are followed by front vowels: [f] becomes [fkʲ] or even [skʲ], and similarly [v] becomes [vɡʲ] or [zɡʲ]: [fkʲer / skʲer, ˈvɡʲerme / ˈzɡʲerme] for fier, vierme.

=== Morphological and syntactical features ===
- The possessive article is variable: al, a, ai, ale (the same as in standard Romanian), whereas it is invariable in all other dialects.
- When the object of a verb is another verb, the latter is in its subjunctive form: vreau să plec, știe să înoate ('I want to leave, he knows how to swim').
- The following subjunctive forms are found: să stea, să dea, să bea, să ia, să vrea.
- The following imperative forms are found: adu, vino.
- Feminine names in the vocative case end in -o: Leano, Anico.
- An additional vowel alternation occurs from [a] to [ə] to mark the plural.
- Verbs of the 2nd conjugation group tend to switch the 3rd, and vice versa: a cade, a place, a vede, and a cusea, a țesea ('to fall, like, see; sew, weave', compare with standard a cădea, a plăcea, a vedea, and a coase, a țese).
- The imperfect of verbs in the 3rd person plural ends in [a] in Muntenia and [aw] in Oltenia: ei lucra vs. ei lucrau ('they were working', compare with standard ei lucrau). This makes the Muntenian plural homonymous with the singular in the 3rd person.
- The syllable -ră- in the plural forms of the pluperfect is dropped: noi cântasem, voi cântaseți, ei cântase ('we/you/they had sung', compare with standard noi cântaserăm, voi cântaserăți, ei cântaseră).
- In Muntenia, an additional -ără is attached to the compound perfect of verbs: am cântatără, am făcutără ('I/we sang', compare with standard am cântat, am făcut).
- In Muntenia, the present indicative, the subjunctive, and the gerund of some verbs have [j] or [i] instead of the last consonant in the root: eu cei, eu spui, eu să spui, eu țâu, eu viu, ceind, țâind, viind (compare with standard eu cer, eu spun, eu să spun, eu țin, eu vin, cerând, ținând, venind).
- In Oltenia, the simple perfect is frequently used in all persons and reflects the aspect of a recently finished action. For speakers of other Romanian dialects, this is by far the single most known particularity of the Oltenian speech, which most readily identifies its speakers.
- In Oltenia, feminine nouns ending in -ă tend to form the plurals with the ending -i to avoid the homonymy that would occur in nouns whose root ends in [s, z, ʃ, ʒ, t͡s, d͡z]: casă – căși ('house – houses', compare with standard casă – case).
- In Oltenia, the demonstrative adjective ăștea is invariable: băieții ăștea, fetele ăștea, drumurile ăștea ('these boys/girls/roads', compare with standard aceștia/acestea and colloquial ăștia/astea).
- In Oltenia, verbs of the 4th conjugation group do not take the infix -esc- in their indicative and subjunctive forms: amoárte, se pérpele, să jéluie, ciugoále, jumoále (compare with standard amorțește, se perpelește, să jelească, ciugulește, jumulește).
- In Oltenia, the adverb decât is used without negation: Are decât un copil ('She has only one child', compare with standard Nu are decât un copil). This phenomenon is also increasingly found in Muntenia.

=== Lexical particularities ===
- The demonstrative article is ăl, a, ăi, ăle in Muntenia, and al, a, ai, ale in Oltenia (compare with standard cel, cea, cei, cele).
- An intermediate polite pronoun is found: tale, tălică ('you', standard Romanian has tu, dumneata, and dumneavoastră on a three-stage scale of increasing politeness).
- Demonstrative adverbs use the emphasis particle -șa: aicișa, icișa, acoloșa, coloșa, coleașa (compare with standard aici, acolo).
- There is a tendency to add the prefix în-/îm- to verbs: a îngăuri, a se împlimba, a împarfuma ('to drill, walk, scent', compare with standard a găuri, a se plimba, a parfuma).
- In Oltenia, the derivation with the suffix -ete is very productive: brabete ('male sparrow', standard vrăbioi), unghete ('corner', unghi), dovlete ('pumpkin', dovleac). It also appears in proper names: Ciuculete, Ionete, Purcărete.
- Other specific words: drugă ('corn cob', standard știulete), clupsă ('mouse trap', cursă de șoareci), tron ('coffin', sicriu), sacsie ('flower pot', ghiveci), dul ('swelling', umflătură), etc.

=== Sample ===
Wallachian dialect: [sə ˈdut͡ʃe pəˈrint͡sɨ koˈpiluluj la ˈmo̯aʃə ku koˈpilu ‖ ˈdut͡ʃe ploˈkon ˈpɨjne vʲin ˈkarne t͡sujkə ‖ ʃɨ ˈmo̯aʃa ɨj ˈpune uŋ kʷoˈvriɡ ɨŋ kap ʃɨl ˈsaltə̃ sus ɨl də də ˈɡrinda ˈkasɨ ʃɨ zɨt͡ʃe ‖ sə trəˈjaskə neˈpotu ʃɨ pəˈrint͡sɨ]

Standard Romanian: Se duc părinții copilului la moașă cu copilul. Duc plocon pâine, vin, carne, țuică. Și moașa îi pune un covrig în cap și-l saltă-n sus, îl dă de grinda casei și zice: Să trăiască nepotul și părinții!

English translation: "The child's parents go to the midwife with the child. They bring as a present bread, wine, meat, țuică. And the midwife puts a pretzel on his head and hoists him up, touches him to the house's girder, and says: Long live the child and his parents!"

== See also ==
- Romanian phonology

== Bibliography ==
- Vasile Ursan, "Despre configurația dialectală a dacoromânei actuale", Transilvania (new series), 2008, No. 1, pp. 77–85 (in Romanian)
- Ilona Bădescu, "Dialectologie", teaching material for the University of Craiova (in Romanian)
- Elena Buja, Liliana Coposescu, Gabriela Cusen, Luiza Meseșan Schmitz, Dan Chiribucă, Adriana Neagu, Iulian Pah, Raport de țară: România, country report for the Lifelong Learning Programme MERIDIUM (in Romanian)
