= Oltenian dialect =

Romanian dialect

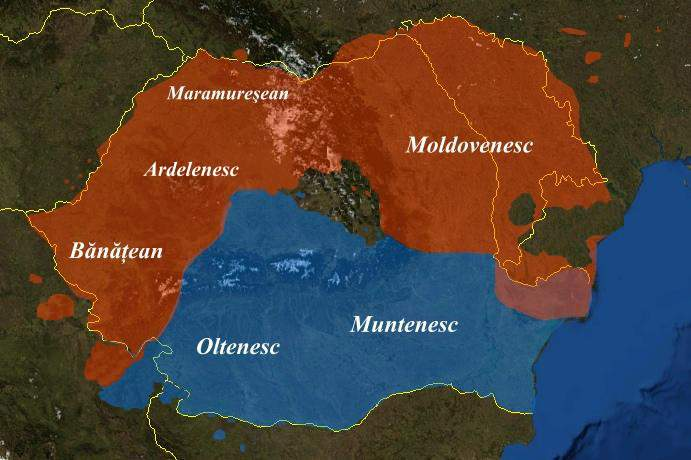
Map of the Romanian dialects, with Oltenian (oltenesc) on the southwest

The Oltenian dialect (Romanian: subdialectul/graiul oltenesc) is a dialect of the Romanian language spoken in the region of Oltenia, in Romania. Regionalisms from Oltenia include cloță (găină in standard Romanian, "chicken"), oichi (ochi, "eye") and a străfiga (a strănuta, "to sneeze"). A well-known particularity of the Oltenian dialect is the widespread usage of the simple perfect (perfectul simplu) verb form for both past and present actions. Oltenian is also spoken in the Timok Valley by the Timok Vlachs of Serbia and Bulgaria. Other than Oltenian, they also speak the Banat dialect.
