= Romanian dialects =

Romanian dialects (Romanian: subdialecte or graiuri) are divided into two types, northern and southern, but further subdivisions are less clear, so the number of dialects varies between two and occasionally twenty. Most recent works seem to favor a number of three clear dialects, corresponding to the regions of Wallachia, Moldavia, and Banat (all of which actually extend into Transylvania), and an additional group of varieties covering the remainder of Transylvania, two of which are more clearly distinguished, in Crișana and Maramureș, that is, a total of five.

The main criteria used in their classification are the phonetic features. Of less importance are the morphological, syntactical, and lexical particularities, as they are too small to provide clear distinctions. All Romanian dialects are mutually intelligible.

== Terminology ==
The term dialect is sometimes avoided when speaking about the Daco-Romanian varieties, especially by Romanian linguists, who regard Daco-Romanian, Aromanian, Megleno-Romanian, and Istro-Romanian as dialects of a single Romanian language. Linguists make no universal distinction between a dialect and a language, as there is no clear boundary between the two and in common usage the distinction is often made based on other cultural, political factors, rather than purely linguistic ones, and these can be very inconsistent across the world. This can also make description of a variety as a language or dialect very sensitive. Nonetheless, common working conventions arise in particular cases and contexts, and for the purposes of this article, Aromanian, Megleno-Romanian and Istro-Romanian are considered separate languages from Romanian rather than dialects of it.

== Criteria ==
Early dialectal studies of Romanian tended to divide the language according to administrative regions, which in turn were usually based on historical provinces. This led sometimes to divisions into three varieties, Wallachian, Moldavian, and Transylvanian, or four, adding one for Banat. Such classifications came to be made obsolete by the later, more rigorous studies, based on a more thorough knowledge of linguistic facts.

The publication of a linguistic atlas of Romanian by Gustav Weigand in 1908 and later, in the interwar period, of a series of dialectal atlases by a team of Romanian linguists, containing detailed and systematic data gathered across the areas inhabited by Romanians, allowed researchers to elaborate more reliable dialectal descriptions of the language.

The criteria given the most weight in establishing the dialectal classification were the regular phonetic features, in particular phenomena such as palatalization, monophthongization, vowel changes, etc. Only secondarily were morphological particularities used, especially where the phonetic features proved to be insufficient. Lexical particularities were the least relied upon.

=== Phonetic criteria ===
Only the most systematic phonetic features have been considered in dialectal classifications, such as the following.

- fricatization and palatalization of the affricates [t͡ʃ, d͡ʒ];
- closing of the unstressed non-initial [e] to [i];
- closing of word-final [ə] to [ɨ];
- opening of pre-stress [ə] to [a];
- monophthongization of [e̯a] to [e] or [ɛ] when the next syllable contains [e];
- pronunciation of [e] and [i] after fricatives [s z ʃ ʒ] and affricate [t͡s];
- pronunciation of [e] after labials;
- pronunciation of the words câine, mâine, pâine with [ɨj] or [ɨ]
- presence of a final whispered [u];
- the degree of palatalization of labials;
- the degree of palatalization of dentals;
- palatalization of the fricatives [s z] and the affricate [t͡s];
- palatalization of fricatives [ʃ ʒ].

For ease of presentation, some of the phonetic features above are described by taking the standard Romanian pronunciation as reference, even though in dialectal characterizations such a reference is not necessary and etymologically speaking the process might have had the opposite direction. A criterion such as "closing of word-final [ə] to [ɨ]" should be understood to mean that some Romanian dialects have [ɨ] in word-final positions where others have [ə] (compare, for instance, Moldavian [ˈmamɨ] vs Wallachian [ˈmamə], both meaning "mother").

The most important phonetic process that helps in distinguishing the Romanian dialects concerns the consonants pronounced in standard Romanian as the affricates [t͡ʃ] and [d͡ʒ]:

- In the Wallachian dialect they remain affricates.
- In the Moldavian dialect they become the fricatives [ʃ, ʒ].
- In the Banat dialect they become the palatal fricatives [ʃʲ, ʒʲ].
- In the Transylvanian varieties they diverge: [t͡ʃ] remains an affricate, whereas [d͡ʒ] becomes [ʒ].

== Classification ==
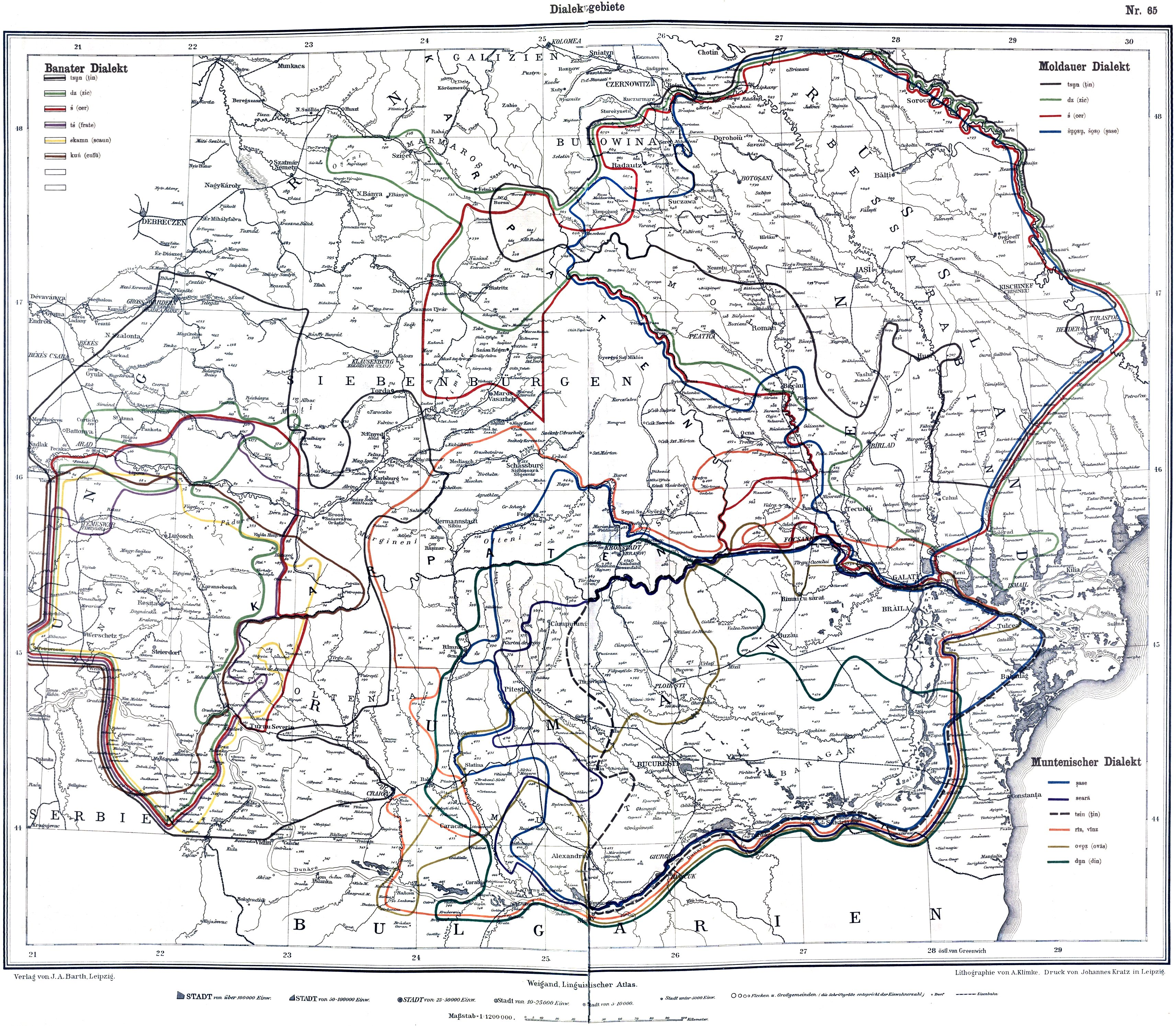
An early map representing a three-dialect system, published by Gustav Weigand in 1908. The map shows the isoglosses corresponding to the pronunciation of a few words.

The Romanian dialects have proven hard to classify and are highly debated. Various authors, considering various classification criteria, arrived at different classifications and divided the language into two to five dialects, but occasionally as many as twenty:

- 2 dialects: Wallachian, Moldavian;
- 3 dialects: Wallachian, Moldavian, Banat;
- 4 dialects: Wallachian, Moldavian, Banat, Crișana;
- 4 dialects: Wallachian, Moldavian, Banat–Hunedoara, northern Transylvania;
- 5 dialects: Wallachian, Moldavian, Banat, Crișana, Maramureș.
- 20 dialects.

Most modern classifications divide the Romanian dialects into two types, southern and northern, further divided as follows:

- The southern type has only one member:
  - the Wallachian dialect (subdialectul muntean or graiul muntean), spoken in the southern part of Romania, in the historical regions of Muntenia, Oltenia, Northern Dobruja (the southern part), but also extending in the southern parts of Transylvania and to Serbia and Bulgaria (parts of the Timok Valley and in the Danube's shores). The orthoepy as well as the other aspects of the standard Romanian are largely based on this dialect.
- The northern type consists of several dialects:
  - the Moldavian dialect (subdialectul moldovean or graiul moldovean), spoken in the historical region of Moldavia, now split among Romania, the Republic of Moldova, and Ukraine (Bukovina and Bessarabia), as well as the northern part of Northern Dobruja and Transnistria;
  - the Banat dialect (subdialectul bănățean or graiul bănățean), spoken in the historical region of Banat and in parts of Serbia (Vojvodina and the rest of the Timok Valley, see Romanian language in Serbia);
  - a group of Transylvanian varieties (graiuri transilvănene), among which two or three varieties are often distinguished, those of Crișana (graiul crișean), Maramureș (graiul maramureșean), and sometimes Oaș (graiul oșean). This distinction, however, is more difficult to make than for the other dialects, since the Transylvanian varieties are much more finely divided and show features that prove them to be transition varieties of the neighboring dialects.

== Argots and speech forms ==
The Romanian language has developed some peculiar argots and speech forms. One example is the Gumuțeasca, spoken by the people of the commune of Mărgău so outsiders could not understand them on their way to bigger cities to sell their traditional glass products. It has thousands of words and a rich vocabulary that differs greatly from Romanian. Another example is the Totoiana, spoken in the village of Totoi. It consists in the inversion of Romanian words and is unintelligible for normal Romanian speakers, but its origins are unknown.

== See also ==
- Aromanian dialects

== Bibliography ==
- Vasile Ursan, "Despre configurația dialectală a dacoromânei actuale", Transilvania (new series), 2008, No. 1, pp. 77–85 (in Romanian)
- Ilona Bădescu, "Dialectologie", teaching material for the University of Craiova.
