= Moldavian dialect =

Dialect of Romanian

Moldavian
- Graiul moldovean or Graiul moldovenesc
- Native to: Moldova, Romania, Ukraine
- Region: see geographic distribution
- Ethnicity: Romanians
- Language family: Indo-European: Italic; Latino-Faliscan; Latin; Romance; Eastern; Romanian; Northern; Moldavian

Language codes
- ISO 639-3: None (mis)
- Glottolog: mold1248

The Moldavian dialect (Graiul moldovean or Graiul moldovenesc in Romanian) is one of several dialects of the Romanian language (Daco-Romanian). It is spoken across the approximate area of the historical region of Moldavia, now split between the Republic of Moldova, Romania, and Ukraine. The Moldavian dialect is one of the main regional varieties of the Daco-Romanian grouping of dialects, with consistent phonetic, lexical, and syntactic features that distinguish it from other dialects, including the Wallachian variety upon which the modern Romanian literary standard is based. Though largely mutually intelligible with other Romanian dialects nowadays, Moldavian retains both archaic elements and regional innovations that may or may not be shared with other dialects.

The Moldavian dialect can be considered a vernacular or 'speech' when contrasted with a standardized variety of the language existing within a particular social and economic context. In this case, Moldavian has increasingly approached such a classification due to dialect levelling, since the promotion of the Wallachian dialect, among others, as a basis for the standard variety of formal and literary Romanian, leading to a reduction of urban Moldavian varieties to primarily informal forms, and, for some speakers, to the level of merely an accent. However, Moldavian has historically evolved to the point of being a dialect, hence its present classification within currently complex sociolinguistic dynamics. This dialect has not been consistently written, except in specific historical and artistic contexts. In this instance, the Romanian orthography is generally used, or the Moldovan Cyrillic alphabet.

== Classification ==
The Moldavian dialect is the representative of the northern grouping of Daco-Romanian dialects and has influenced the Romanian spoken over large areas of Transylvania. The name of the dialect reflects the historical region of Moldavia, which encompasses regions including and beyond the Republic of Moldova.

While the Moldavian dialect had been considered mostly as equal as the other dialects for much of its history, the rise of a standardized literary Romanian, based on the Wallachian (Bucharest) variety with Latin neologisms, first promoted with the rise of Romanian nationalism in the 19th century and later institutionalized, gradually reduced the prestige of regional varieties like Moldavian in formal and public contexts. Writers from the Moldavian region since the 16th century had been heavily influenced by the liturgical language of the time, which was Church Slavonic, and a mix of Greek and Latin as well as regional vernaculars or dialects. Standardization by the 20th century led to fluctuating but increasing levels of code-switching, particularly in urban centers such as Chișinău, where speakers often shift between the regional dialect and the standard language depending on formality and perceived social correctness. Over time, this has contributed to the perception of Moldavian as an informal 'speech' or accent, especially among younger and urban populations. Nonetheless, the dialect preserves a certain structure which is internally consistent, and functions like any other dialect that is mostly based in a rural environment. Newer or more scientific vocabulary usually keeps the original standard Romanian pronunciation, the process functioning in a similar way to 19th century learned borrowings from Latin.

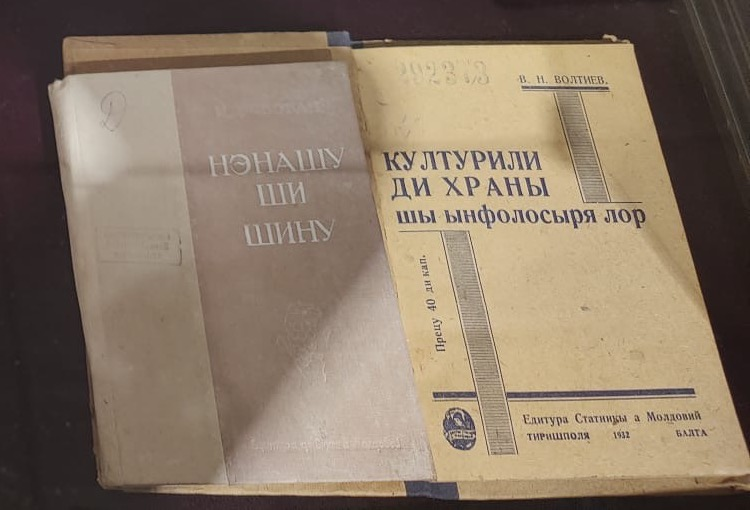
Written media in the 1930s show inconsistent attempts at writing the Moldavian dialect as it is spoken, in Cyrillic.

The Moldavian dialect is not synonymous with the Moldovan language, which had once been an attempt to standardize the Moldavian dialect, though by the late 80s could be considered simply a renaming of the standard Romanian language, also found in Bucharest. The dialect itself has never been successfully standardized in its existence and has almost never been found in academic or administrative settings.

The Moldavian and the Wallachian dialects are the only two that have been consistently identified and recognized by linguists. They are clearly distinct in dialect classifications made by Heimann Tiktin, Mozes Gaster, Gustav Weigand, Sextil Pușcariu, Sever Pop, Emil Petrovici, Romulus Todoran, Ion Coteanu, Alexandru Philippide, Iorgu Iordan, Emanuel Vasiliu, and others, whereas the other dialects have been considerably more controversial and difficult to classify due to unclear boundaries and shifting social contexts.

The border between Romania and the Republic of Moldova does not correspond to any significant isoglosses to justify a dialectal division; phonology and morphology (which commonly define dialectal classifications) are identical across the border, whereas lexical differences are minimal. In fact, larger differences in phonology can be found between the northern and southern regions of the Republic of Moldova.

== Geographic distribution ==
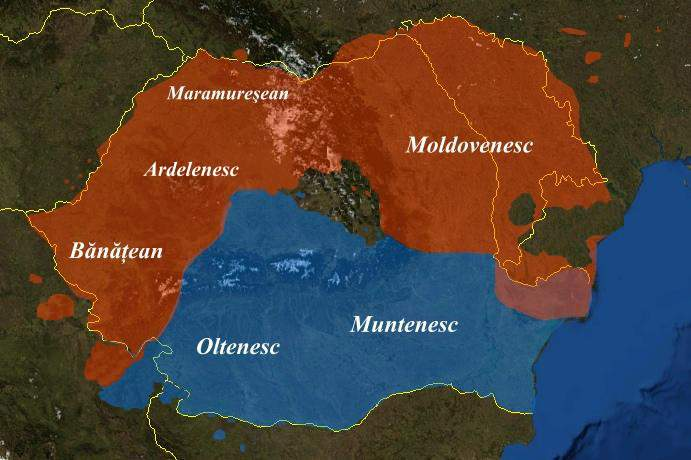
Major varieties (graiuri) of the Romanian language

The Moldavian dialect is spoken in the northeastern part of Romania, the Republic of Moldova, and small areas of Ukraine. It is the only Romance variety spoken east of the Eastern Carpathians. In detail, its distribution area covers the following administrative or historical regions:

- in Western Moldova: the counties of Bacău, Botoșani, Galați, Iași, Neamț, Suceava, Vaslui, Vrancea;
- in Muntenia and Northern Dobruja, some isoglosses extend over the northern parts of the following counties: Buzău, Brăila, Tulcea;
- in the Republic of Moldova: the whole territory, including the breakaway region of Transnistria;
- in Ukraine:
  - Chernivtsi Oblast: Northern Bukovina, the Hertsa region, and Northern Bessarabia;
  - Odesa Oblast: the historical region of Budjak (consisting of the current raions of Bilhorod-Dnistrovskyi, Bolhrad, Izmail) and other hromadas in the Odesa Oblast;
  - smaller pockets in other parts of Ukraine;
- in the north-eastern half of Transylvania, various isoglosses include all or part of the following counties: Bistrița-Năsăud, Harghita, Covasna, Cluj (eastern half), Mureș (northern half).

=== Transitional areas ===
Transitional varieties of the Moldavian dialect are found in areas of contact with the other dialects. As such, Moldavian features often occur outside the historical Moldavia: in northern Dobruja, in northeastern Muntenia, and in north-east Transylvania.

== Phonology ==
Moldavian dialect consonant phonemes
		Labial		Alveolar		Palato- Alveolar	Palatal	Velar		Glottal	
		hard	soft	hard	soft	Palato- Alveolar	Palatal	hard	soft	hard	soft
Nasal		m ⟨м⟩	mʲ ⟨-мь⟩	n ⟨н⟩	nʲ ⟨-нь⟩		ɲ ⟨н(и,е)⟩				
Plosive	unvoiced	p ⟨п⟩	pʲ ⟨-пь⟩	t ⟨т⟩	tʲ ⟨-ть⟩		c ⟨к(и,е)⟩	k ⟨к⟩	kʲ ⟨-кь⟩		
Plosive	voiced	b ⟨б⟩	bʲ ⟨-бь⟩	d ⟨д⟩	dʲ ⟨-дь⟩		ɟ ⟨г(и,е)⟩	ɡ ⟨г⟩	ɡʲ ⟨-гь⟩		
Affricate	unvoiced			t͡s ⟨ц⟩	t͡sʲ ⟨-ць⟩	t͡ʃ ⟨ч⟩					
Affricate	voiced			d͡z ⟨дз⟩		d͡ʒ ⟨ӂ⟩					
Fricative	voiced	v ⟨в⟩	vʲ ⟨-вь⟩	z ⟨з⟩	zʲ ⟨-зь⟩	ʒ ⟨ж⟩	ʝ ⟨ж(и,е)⟩				
Fricative	unvoiced	f ⟨ф⟩	fʲ ⟨-фь⟩	s ⟨с⟩	sʲ ⟨-сь⟩	ʃ ⟨ш⟩	ç ⟨ш(и,е)⟩			h ⟨х⟩	hʲ ⟨-хь⟩
Approximant		w ⟨ў,у⟩		r ⟨р⟩	rʲ ⟨-рь⟩		j ⟨й,и⟩			h ⟨х⟩	hʲ ⟨-хь⟩
Approximant		w ⟨ў,у⟩		l ⟨л⟩	lʲ ⟨-ль⟩		j ⟨й,и⟩			h ⟨х⟩	hʲ ⟨-хь⟩

The soft alveolar consonants and the palatal consonants are considered to be allophones of one another, with the former being realised at the end of words. The soft labial consonants and the palatal consonants would be identical, depending on the region the dialect is spoken in and the phonological context.

Moldavian dialect monophthong phonemes
	Front	Central	Back
Close	i ⟨и⟩	ɨ ⟨ы,-э⟩	u ⟨у⟩
Mid	e ⟨е⟩	ə ⟨э⟩	o ⟨о⟩
Open	a ⟨а⟩		

There are also the standard Romanian diphthongs, though these are largely undifferentiated from the equivalent vowel-glide combinations.

== Particularities ==
=== Phonetic features ===
The Moldavian dialect has the following phonetic particularities that contrast it with the other Romanian dialects:

Consonants

The dialect has a tendency to innovate and amplify more changes (from Common Romanian) compared to standard Romanian (based on the Wallachian dialect), like heavy palatalization and labialization, simplifying affricates, as well as a trend of more frequent lenition and cluster simplification, while still retaining some archaic qualities.

- The postalveolar affricates [t͡ʃ, d͡ʒ] become the fricatives [ʃ, ʒ]: [ˈʃjapɨ, ˈʃinɨ, ˈʒeni] for standard ceapă, cină, gene (they are not also palatalized like in the Banat dialect). As a consequence, the affricate [d͡ʒ] and the fricative [ʒ] merge into the latter: [ʒok, ˈsɨnʒi] for joc, sânĝe. However, the Atlasul lingvistic român (1938–1942) and other field works record examples of pronunciations showing that, while the merger covers most of the dialect area, it is not systematic and sometimes found in free variation. In parts of the south-western and north-eastern Moldova the distinction is preserved.
- After the sibilants [s, z, ʃ, ʒ, t͡s] (sometimes also after [r]), a vowel shift occurs that changes [e] into [ə], [i] into [ɨ], and [e̯a] into [a]: [səmn, ˈsɨŋɡur, ˈsarɨ, zər, zɨd, ˈzamɨ, ˈʃəli, raˈʃɨnɨ, ˈʒəli, t͡səs, ˈt͡sapən, rəʃʲ] for sĕmn, sîngur, séră, ḑer, ḑid, ḑémă, șàle, rășină, jale, țes, țeapăn, reci. In the same phonetic contexts, the phoneme /ʲ/, which is generally responsible for indicating the plural in nouns and adjectives or the second person in verbs, is no longer realized: [paˈrint͡s, vjez] (for standard părinți, vezi). As a consequence, the number distinction is completely lost in some nouns and adjectives, such as moș, leneș, colț, ursuz.
- The labials [p, b, m] receive a palatalized pronunciation when followed by front vowels and become [c, ɟ, ɲ], respectively: [koˈkʲil, ˈɡʲini, ɲʲel] for copil, bine, miel. So, in the Moldavian dialect, copil becomes cochil and sounds like [koˈkʲil] or [kop̚ˈkʲil], piept becomes "chept" or "chiapt" or "cheapt", "piatră" becomes "chiatră", "Petre" becomes "Chetre", "pilos" becomes "chilos", "pili" becomes "chili", "piuar" becomes "chiuar", "pitic" becomes "chitic", "pirandă" becomes "chirandă", "pizdă" becomes "chizdă", "piper" becomes "chiper". It corresponds with Aromanian where Slavic borrowing *kopylъ became "cochil", Latin "pectus" became "cheptu", Latin "petra" became "cheatrã".
- Similarly, the palatalization of the labio-dentals [f, v] occurs, but in two different ways. In the southern half of the dialect area they become [ç, ʝ], respectively, whereas in the northern half they become [ɕ, ʑ]: [ˈhʲerbi / ˈʃʲerbi, ɦʲiˈt͡səl / ʒʲiˈt͡səl] for fierbe, vițel.
- All non-palatal consonants become labialized before the vowel [o], especially in monosyllabic words: [ˈbʷolʲ, ˈzʷorʲ] for boli, zori.
- The dentals [t, d, n] are left unchanged before [e, i, e̯a]: [ˈfrunti, diˈparti, de̯al, ˈneɡru, ˈne̯aɡrə]. However, there is a tendency for affrication to occur due to the frequent palatalization of stop consonants before front vowels.
- The voiceless plosives [p, t, k] are more frequently becoming unreleased at the end of utterances and in stop clusters across word boundaries and in middle positions.
- The affricate [d͡z] occurs, as in [d͡zɨk], as in the Banat dialect, the Maramureș dialect and the Aromanian language, whereas it evolved to [z] in the Wallachian dialect, the Criș dialect, and standard Romanian: [d͡zɨk] for zic (Latin dico).
- In the northern part, [v] followed by [o, u] changes into [h]: holbură, hulpe, hultan (compare with standard volbură, vulpe, vultan).

Vowels

The dialect tends to simplify and reduce unstressed vowels and diphthongs, much like in European Portuguese. Vowel hiatus is also restricted by adding a glide between conflicting vowels. New vowel-glide sequences also come about from the frequent palatalization and labialization. There can be considerable syncopation in polysyllabic words.

- After the labial [v], [e] changes into [ə] and [e̯a] into [a]: [loˈvəsk, sə loˈvaskɨ] for lovesc, să lovească.
- Word-final [ə] becomes [ɨ]: [ˈmamɨ, ˈkasɨ] for mamă, casă. Sometimes [ɨ] can become unvoiced [ɨ̥], when there is strong stress placed on the first syllable, and it may labialize the preceding consonant.
- Unstressed [o] closes to [u]: [akupiˈrit] for acoperit (rare).
- The diphthong [o̯a] is often realized as [wa]: [ˈswari, ˈbwalɨ] for soare, boală.
- The diphthong [e̯a] becomes [ja] for almost all speakers, and most do not distinguish between the two.
- Unstressed [e] in middle and final positions closes to [i]: [ˈlapti, disˈfak] for lapte, desfac.
- In the northern areas, the vowel [ə] immediately before the stress opens to [a]: [maˈɡar, baˈtrɨn, taˈkut, paˈduri] for măgar, bătrân, tăcut, pădure.
- The diphthong [ja] becomes [je]: [bəˈjet, ɨŋkuˈjet] for băiat, încuiat.
- Etymologic [ɨ] is preserved in the words [ˈkɨni, ˈmɨni, mɨnʲ, ˈpɨni] for câine, mâine, mâini, pâine.
- The diphthong [e̯a] in final positions becomes the monophthong [ɛ]: [aˈvɛ, spuˈnɛ] for avea, spunea.
- Asyllabic versions of [i] and [u] occur in word-final positions: [pəduˈrarʲ, koʒoˈkarʲʷ] for pădurar, cojocar.

=== Morphological features ===
The dialect is characterized by its tendency toward more analytical, regular, and simplified morphological structures compared to standard Romanian.

- Feminine nouns ending in -că have genitive and dative forms ending in -căi: maicăi, puicăi (compare with standard maicii, puicii).
- The noun tată "father" with the definite article has the form tatul (standard tatăl).
- The possessive article is invariable: a meu, a mea, a mei, a mele ("mine", standard al meu, a mea, ai mei, ale mele).
- The number distinction is made in verbs in the imperfect at the 3rd person: era / erau, făcea / făceau (like in the standard language).
- The simple perfect is not used, except rarely, only in the 3rd person, with the simple value of a past tense.
- The auxiliary for the compound perfect has the same form for both the singular and the plural of the 3rd person: el o fost / ei o fost ("he was / they were", standard el a fost, ei au fost).
- In northern Moldova, the pluperfect is also made analytically: m-am fost dus, am fost venit ("I had gone, I had come", standard mă dusesem, venisem).
- The future tense in verbs uses the infinitive and is sometimes identical to it: va veni, a veni ("he will come", standard only va veni).
- The following subjunctive forms occur: să deie, să steie, să beie, să ieie, să vreie (standard să dea, să stea, să bea, să ia, să vrea).
- The following imperatives occur: ádă, vină (standard adú, vino).
- When the object of a verb is another verb, the latter is in its infinitive form, including the isolated morpheme a: prinde a fierbe ("starts to boil", the standard uses the subjunctive: prinde să fiarbă or începe să fiarbă).
- Genitives and datives of nouns tend to be formed analytically: dă mâncare la pisică ("give food to the cat", standard dă mâncare pisicii).

=== Lexical particularities ===
- Some words have preserved archaic forms: îmblu, împlu, întru, înflu, nour, dirept (compare with standard umblu, umplu, intru, umflu, nor, drept).
- A particular variant for the personal pronoun for the 3rd person occurs frequently and is used for animates and inanimates alike: dânsul, dânsa, dânșii, dânsele ("he, she, they" as well as "it, they", compare with el, ea, ei, ele). In the standard language, these forms have started being used as 3rd person polite pronouns.
- The demonstrative pronouns have particular forms: [aˈista, aˈjasta, aˈʃela, aˈʃeja] ("this" masculine and feminine, "that" masculine and feminine; compare with standard acesta, aceasta, acela, aceea).
- Other specific words: omăt ("snow", zăpadă), agudă ("mulberry", dudă), poame ("grapes", struguri), perje ("plums", prune), ciubotă ("high boot", cizmă), cori ("measles", pojar), etc.

=== Sample ===
Moldavian dialect: [jɛ aˈvɛ ˈdowɨ vaʃʲ ʃɨ sɨ ɲiˈraw ˈwaminij di ˈvaʃili jij kɨ dəˈdew 'un ʃjubəˈraʃ di ˈlapti ‖ ʃɨ aˈʃa di la o ˈvremi stɨrˈkisɨrɨ ˈvaʃili ‖ nu məj dəˈdew ˈlapti]

Standard Romanian: Ea avea două vaci și se mirau oamenii de vacile ei că dădeau un ciubăraș de lapte. Și așa de la o vreme stârpiseră vacile, nu mai dădeau lapte.

English translation: "She had two cows and people were amazed at her cows for giving a bucketful of milk. And so from a while the cows became dry, they stopped giving milk."

The Romanian vocabulary in parts of Moldova, Bessarabia and Transnistria. Researches made by Gustav Weigand:

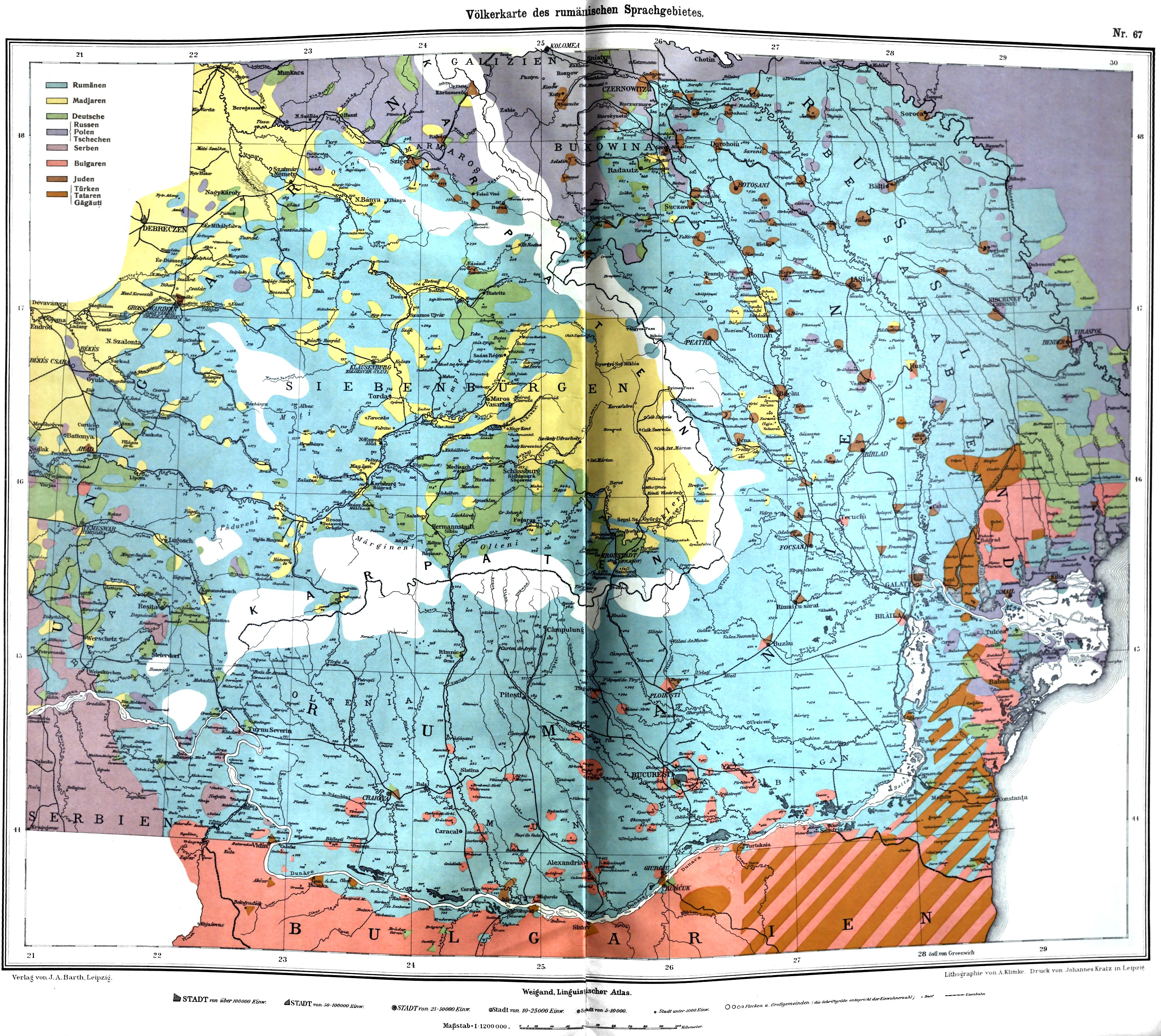
The Romanian linguistic areal (1908)

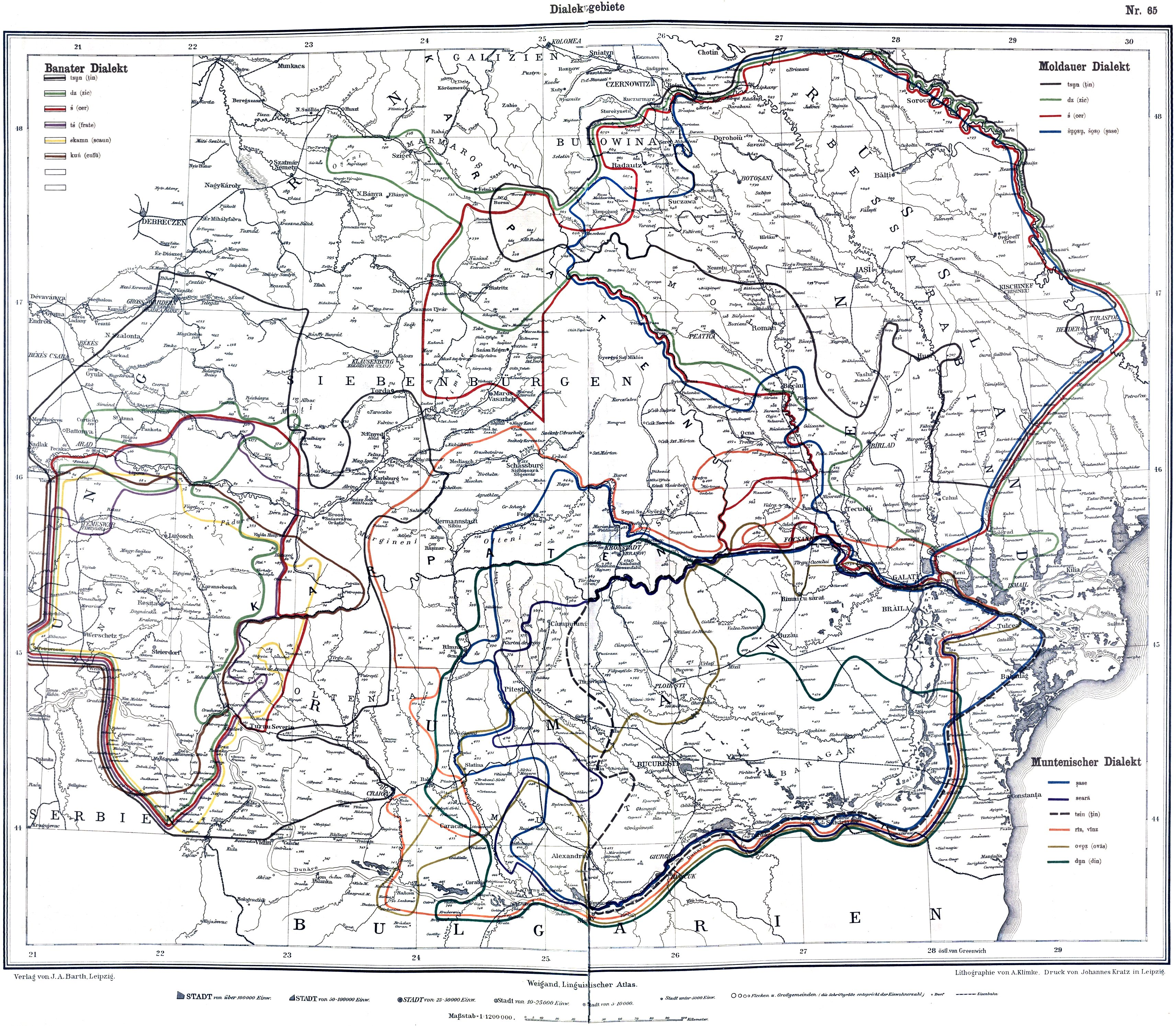
The extension of the Moldovan characteristic isoglosses (1908)

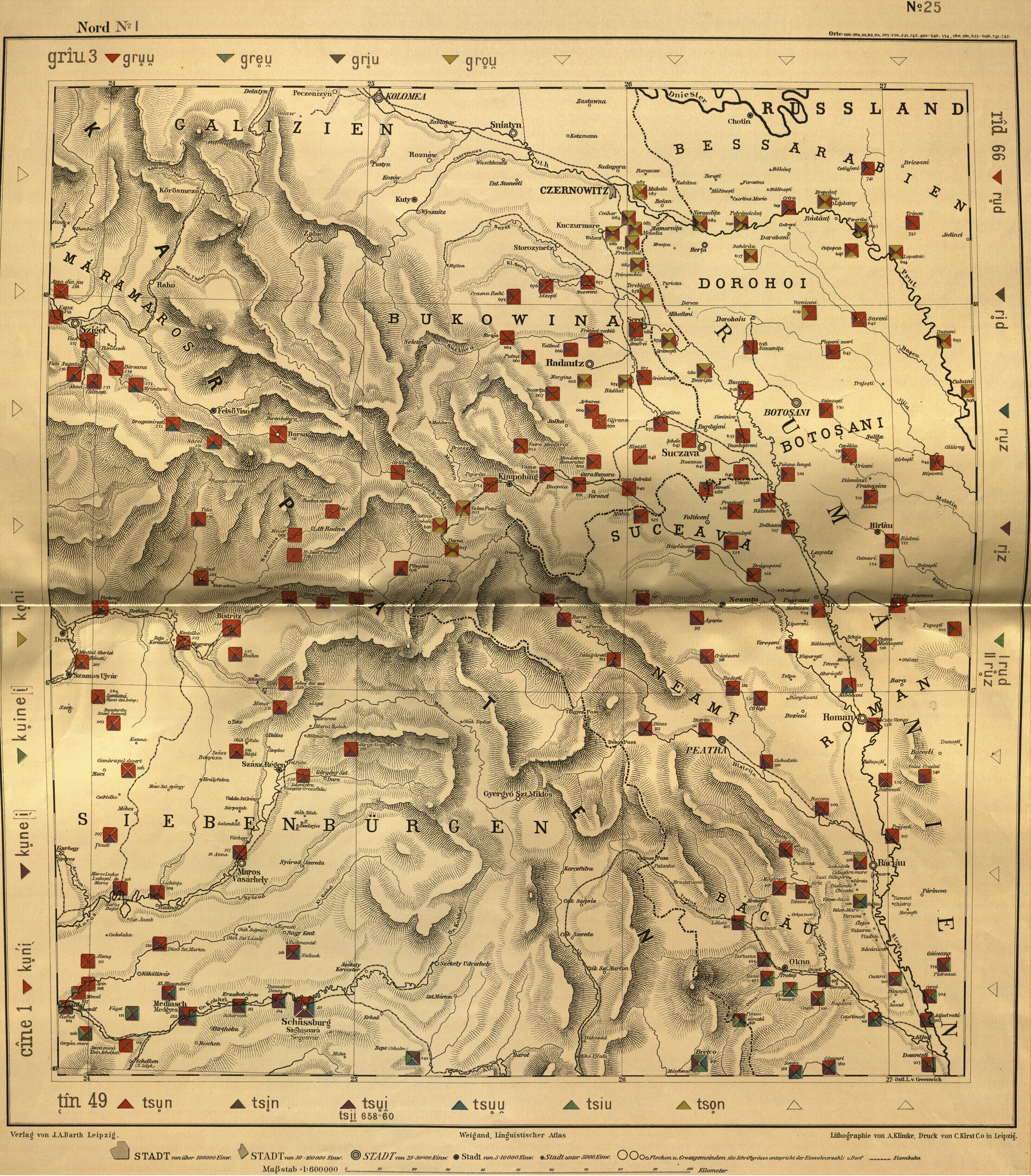

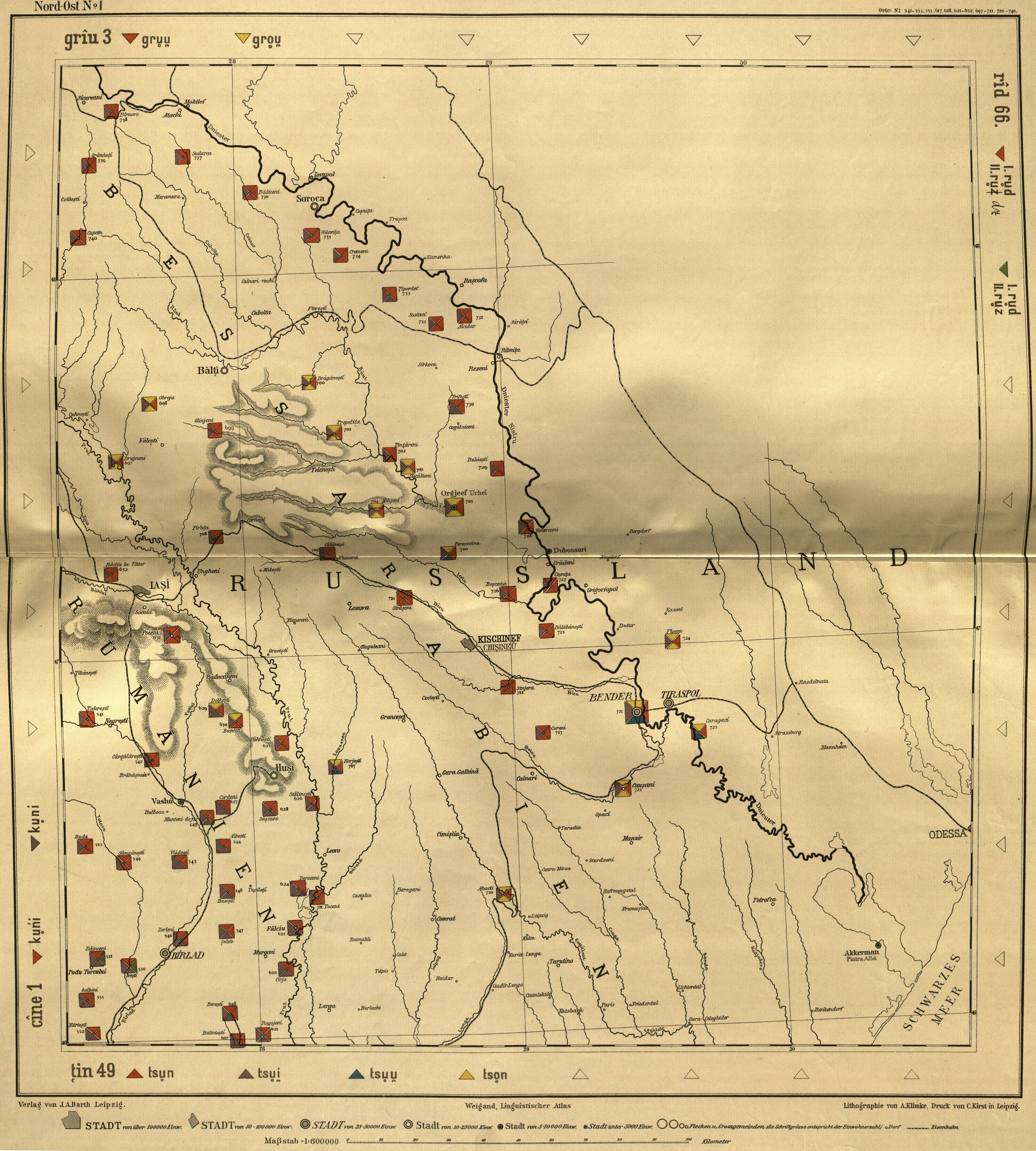

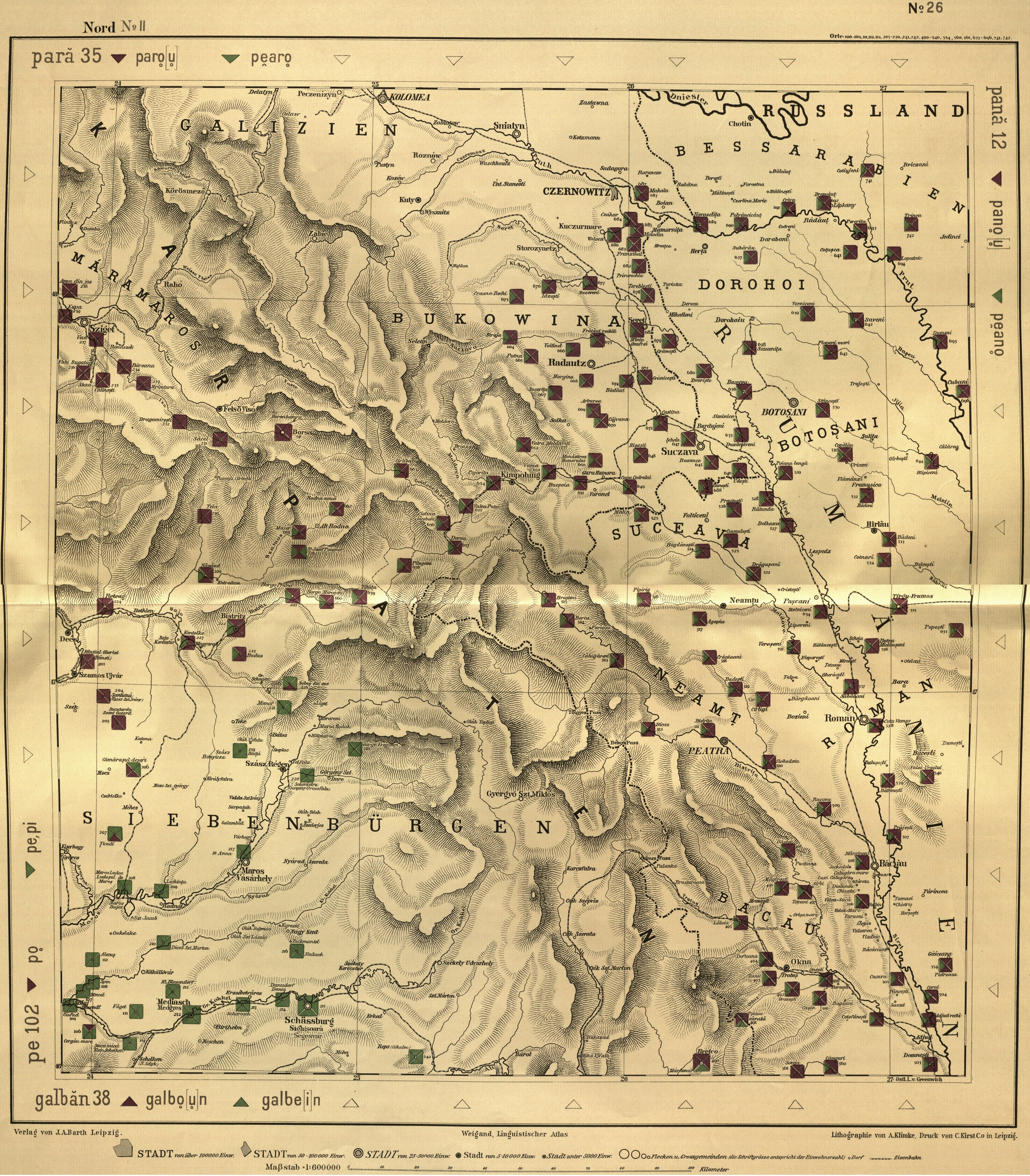

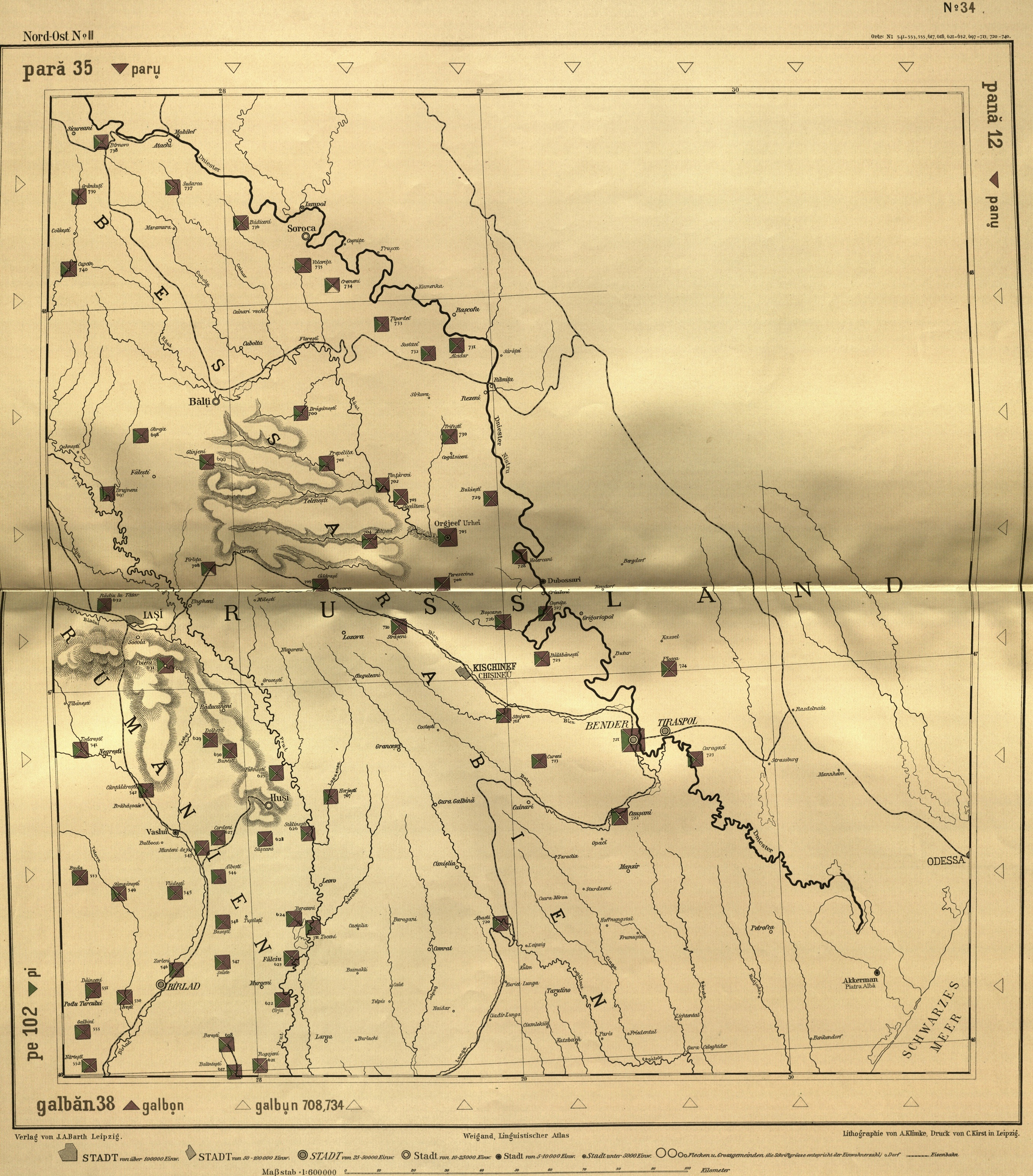

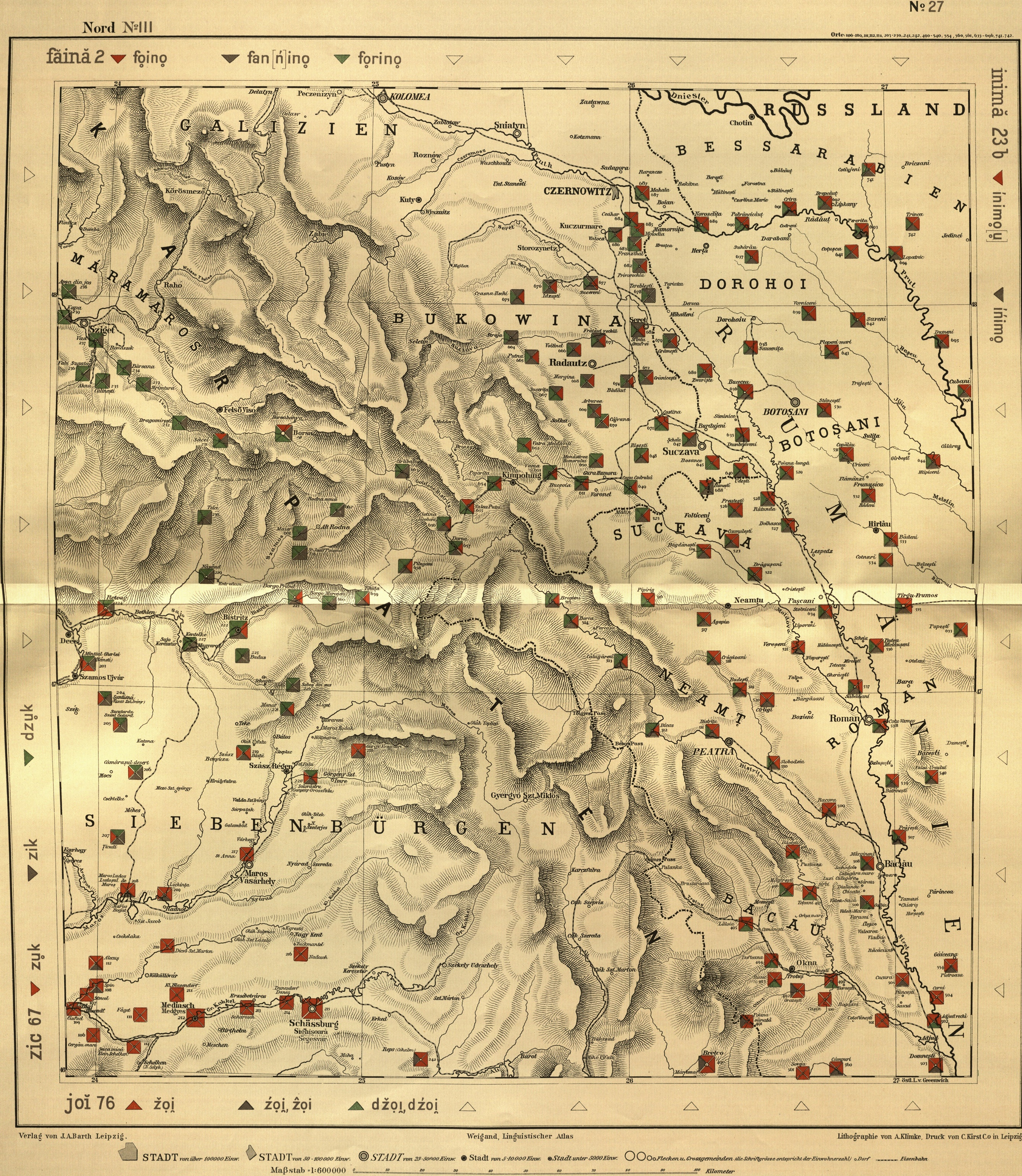

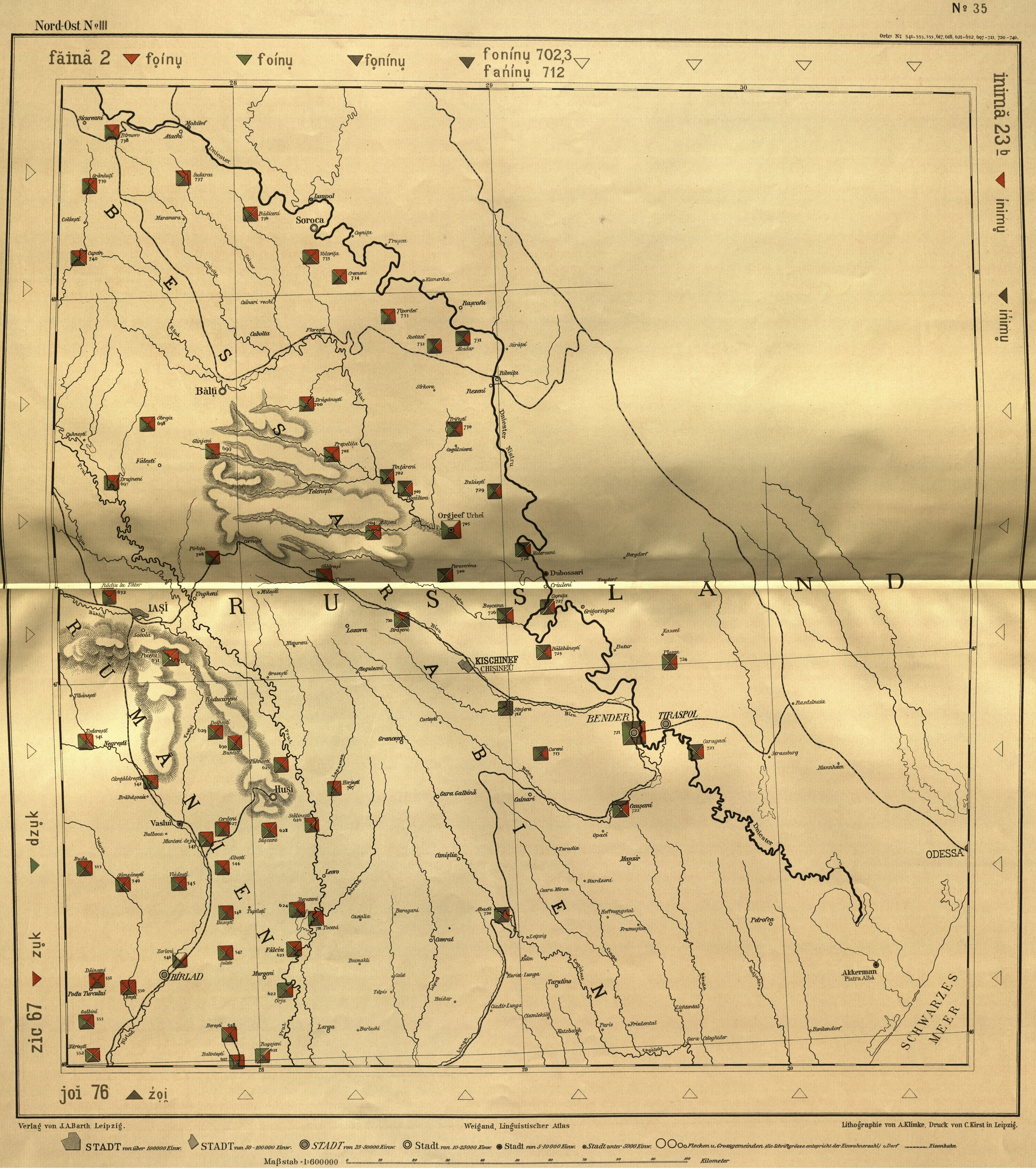

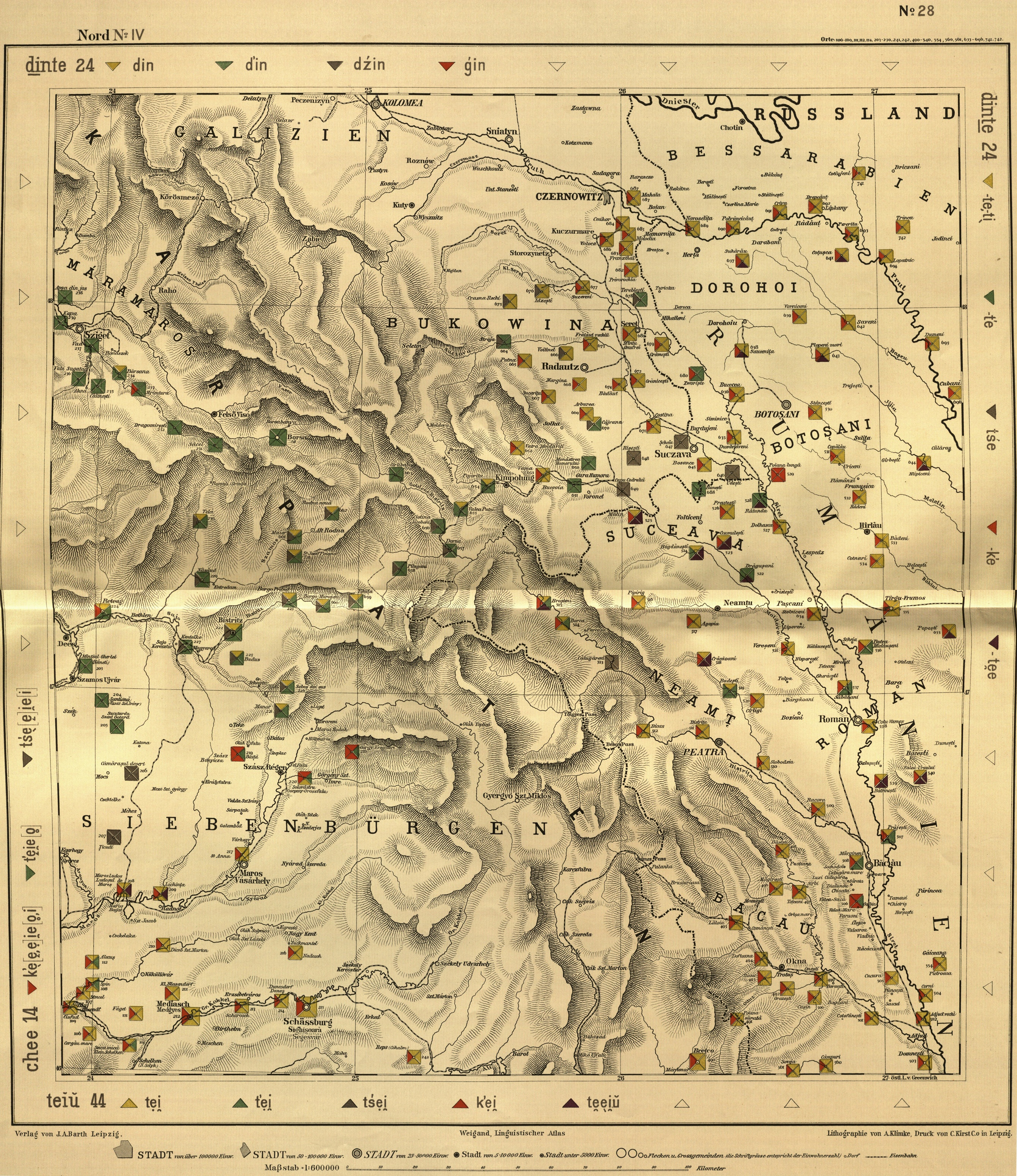

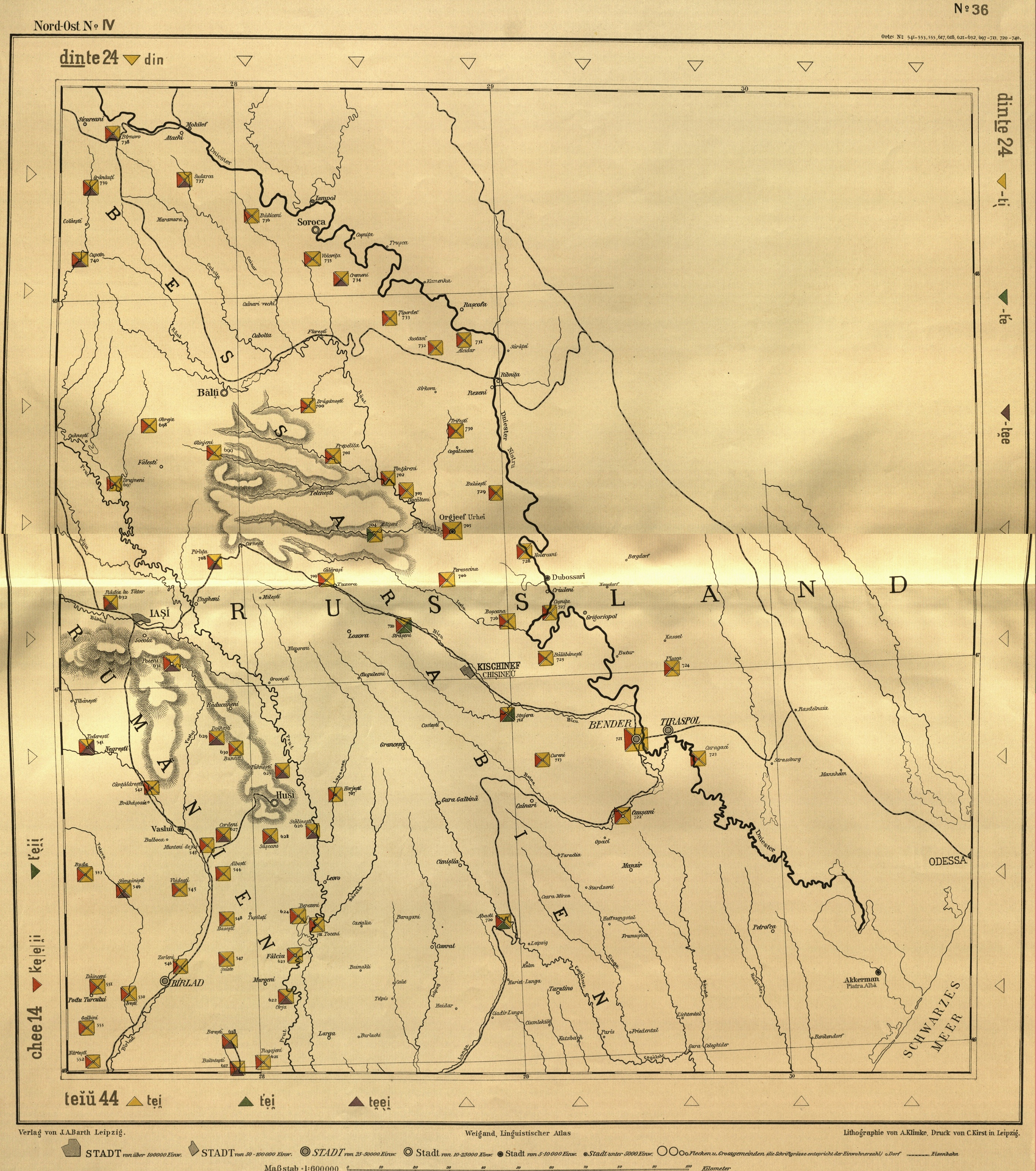

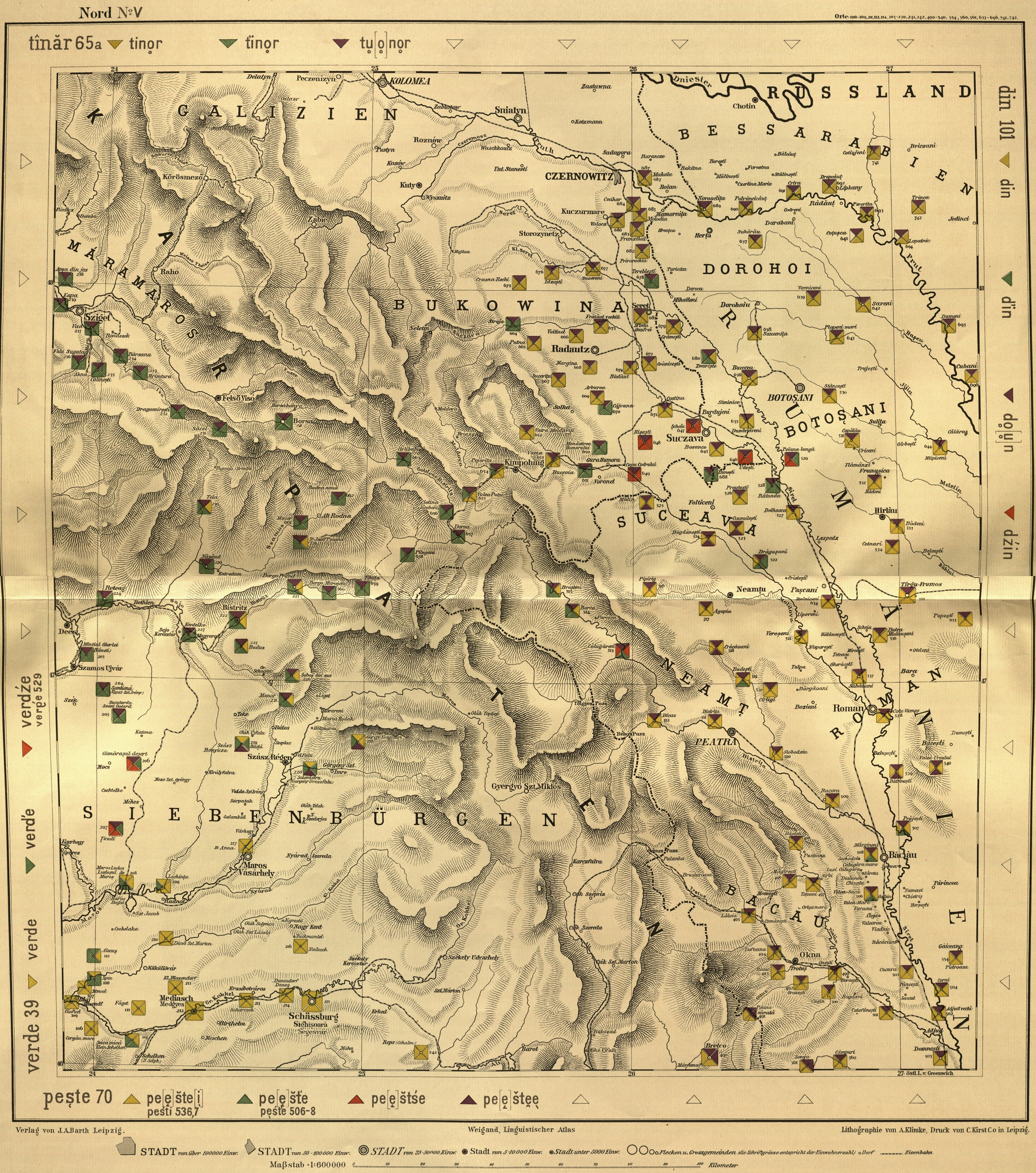

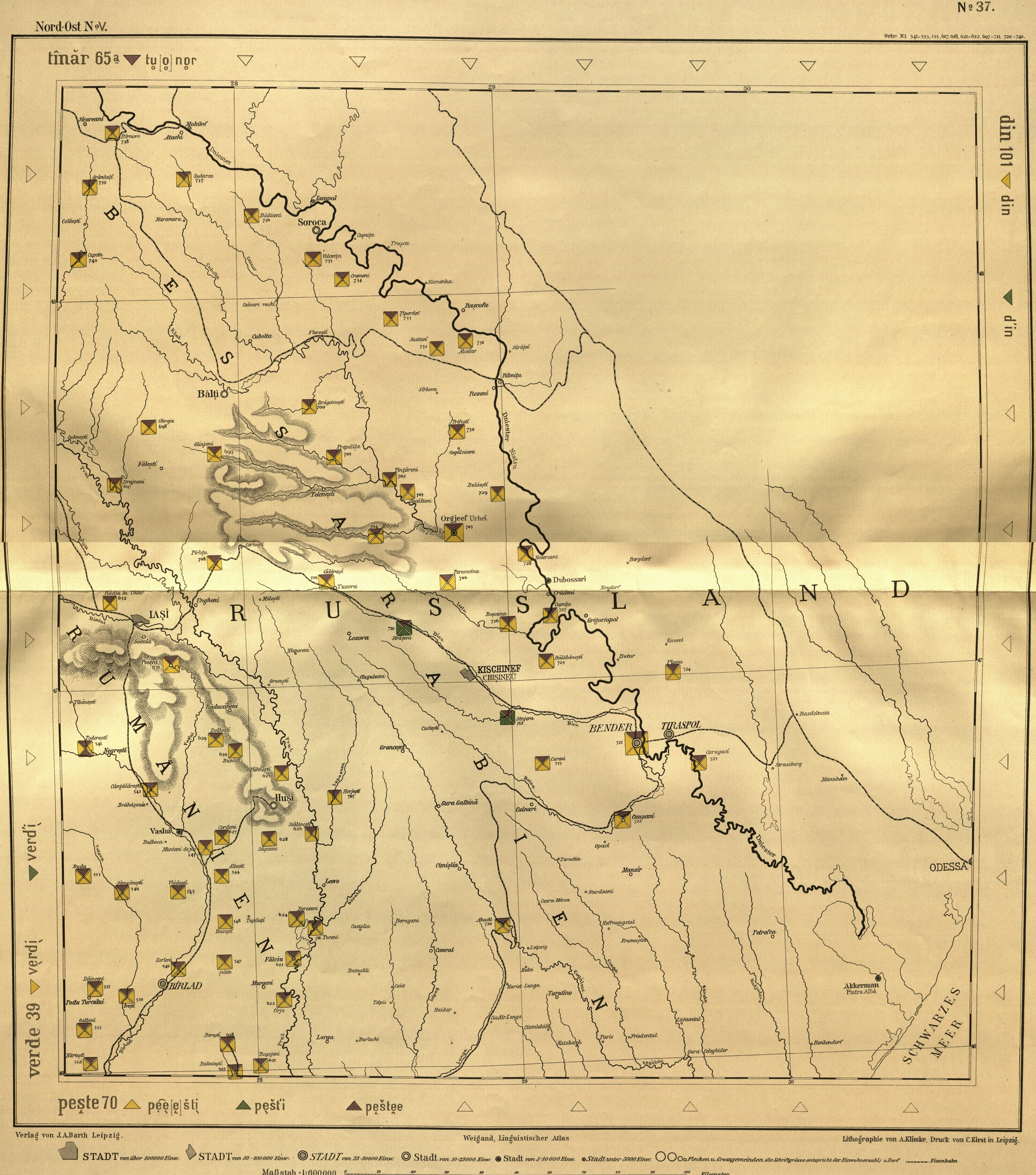

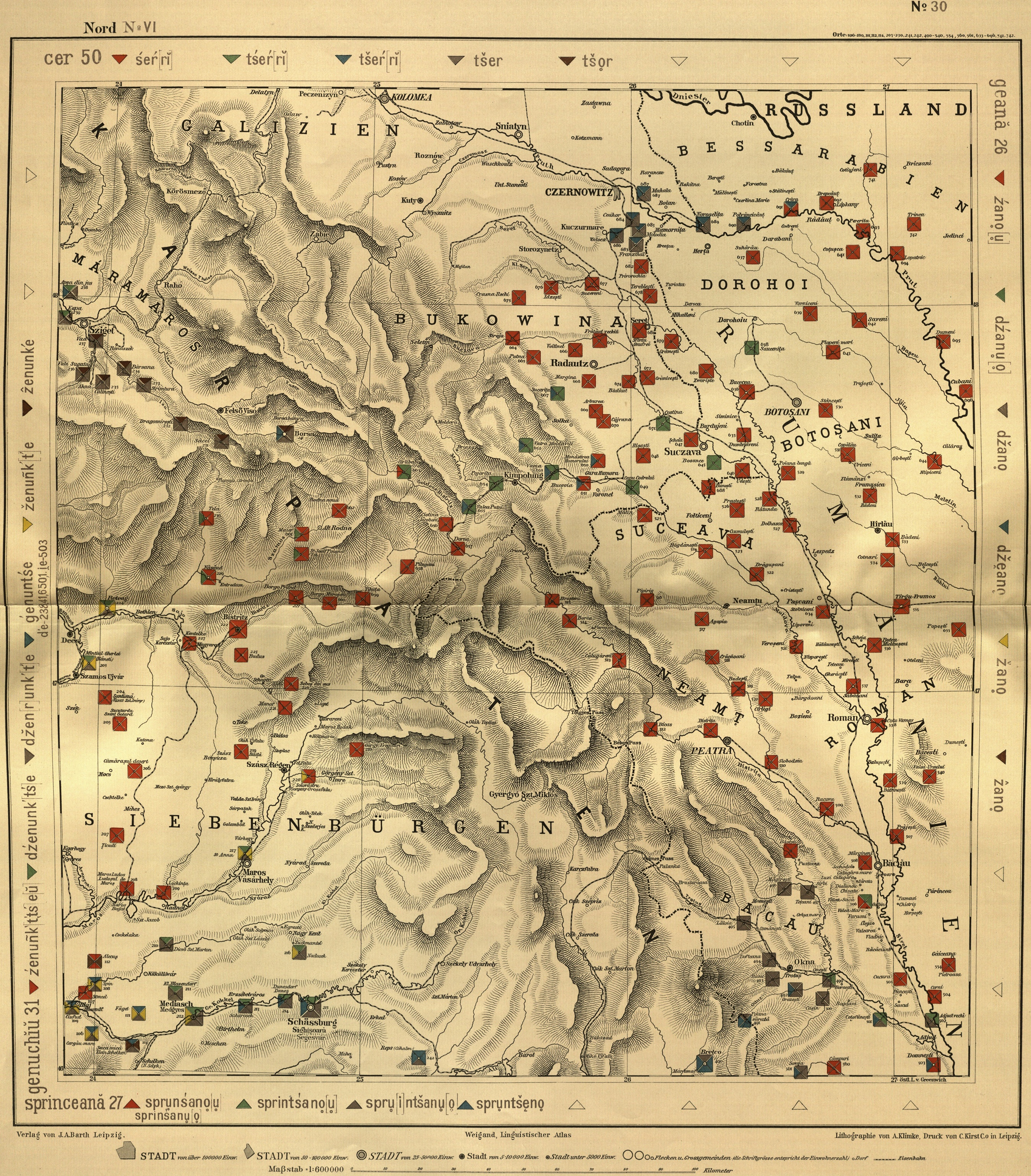

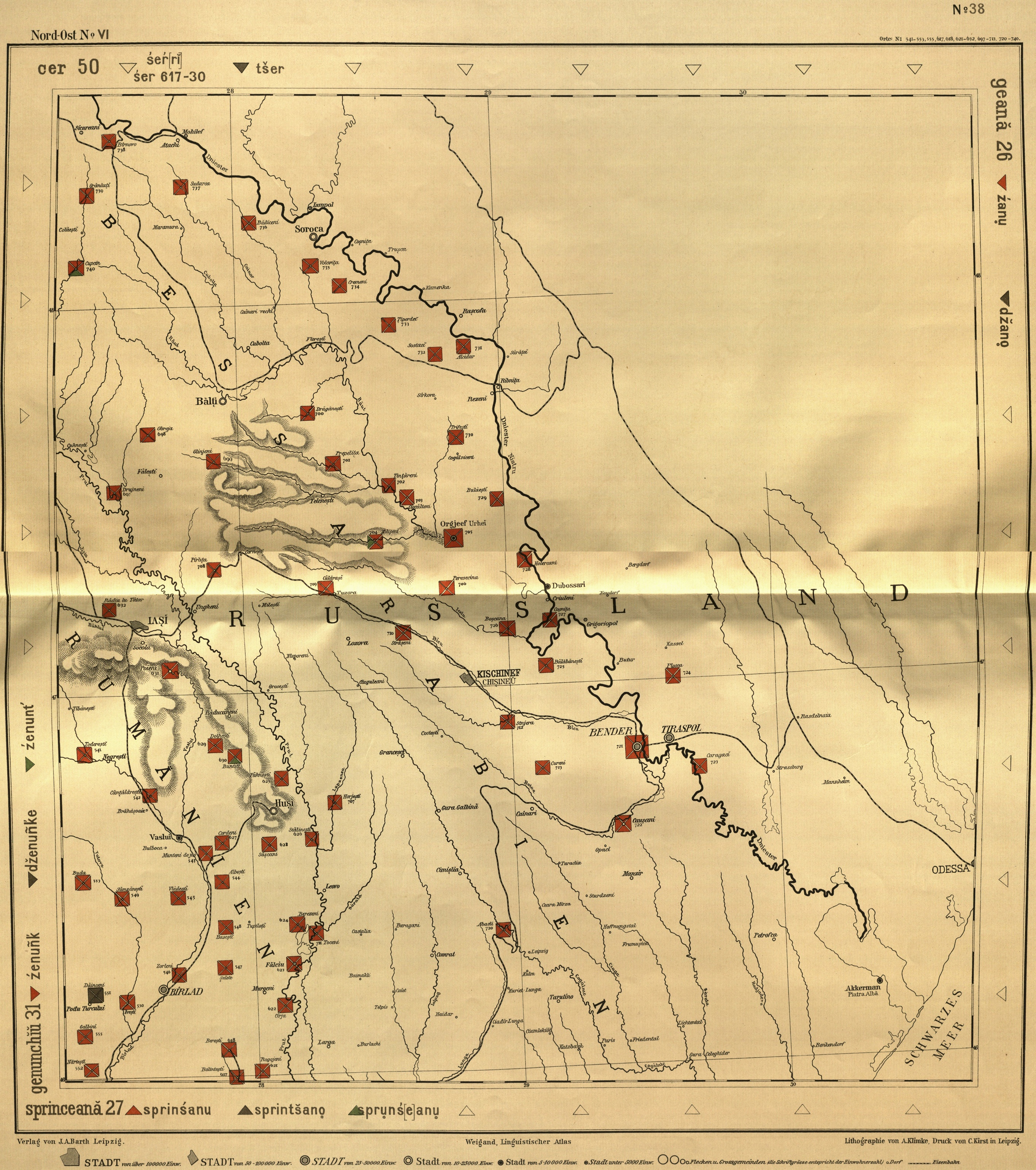

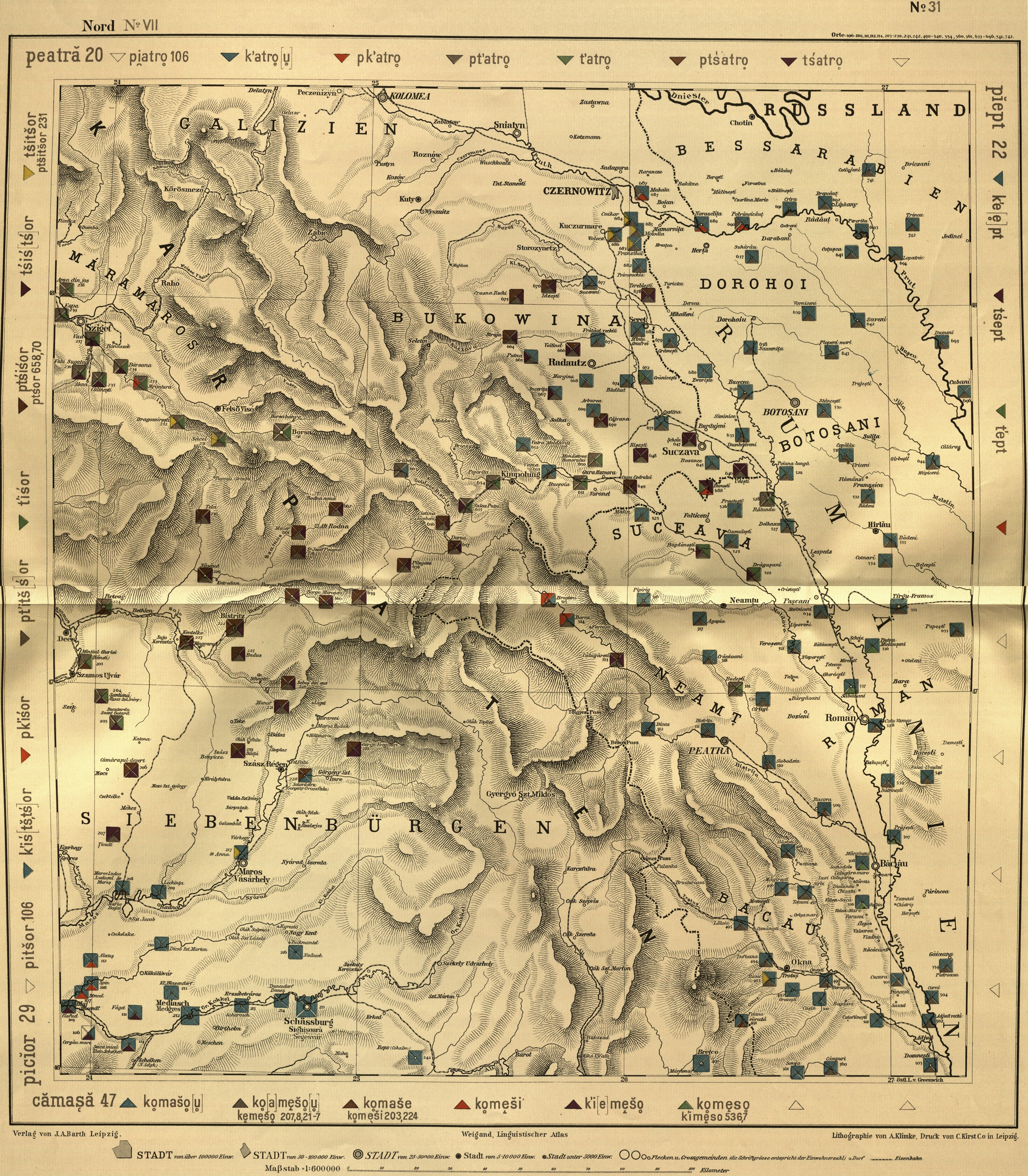

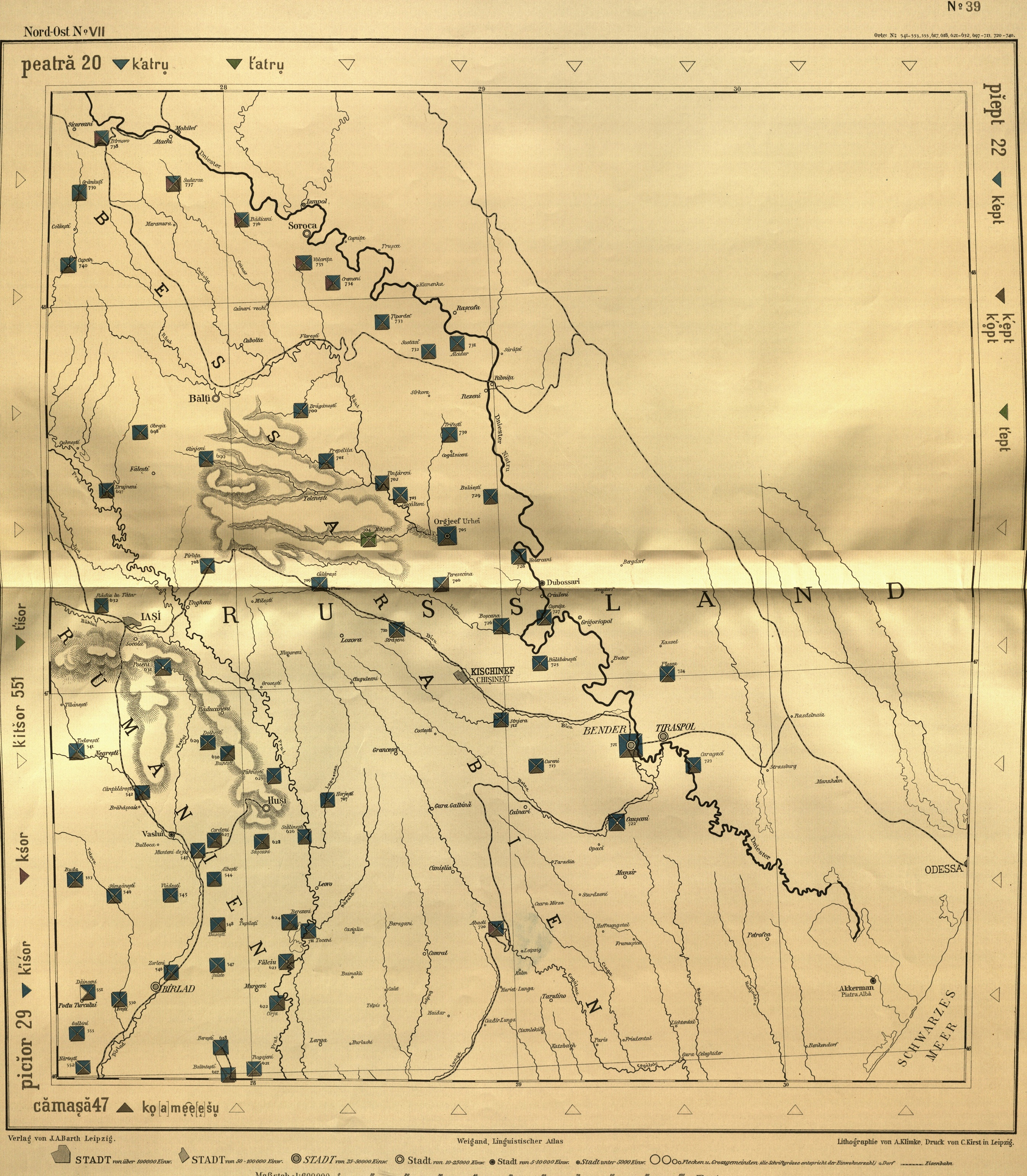

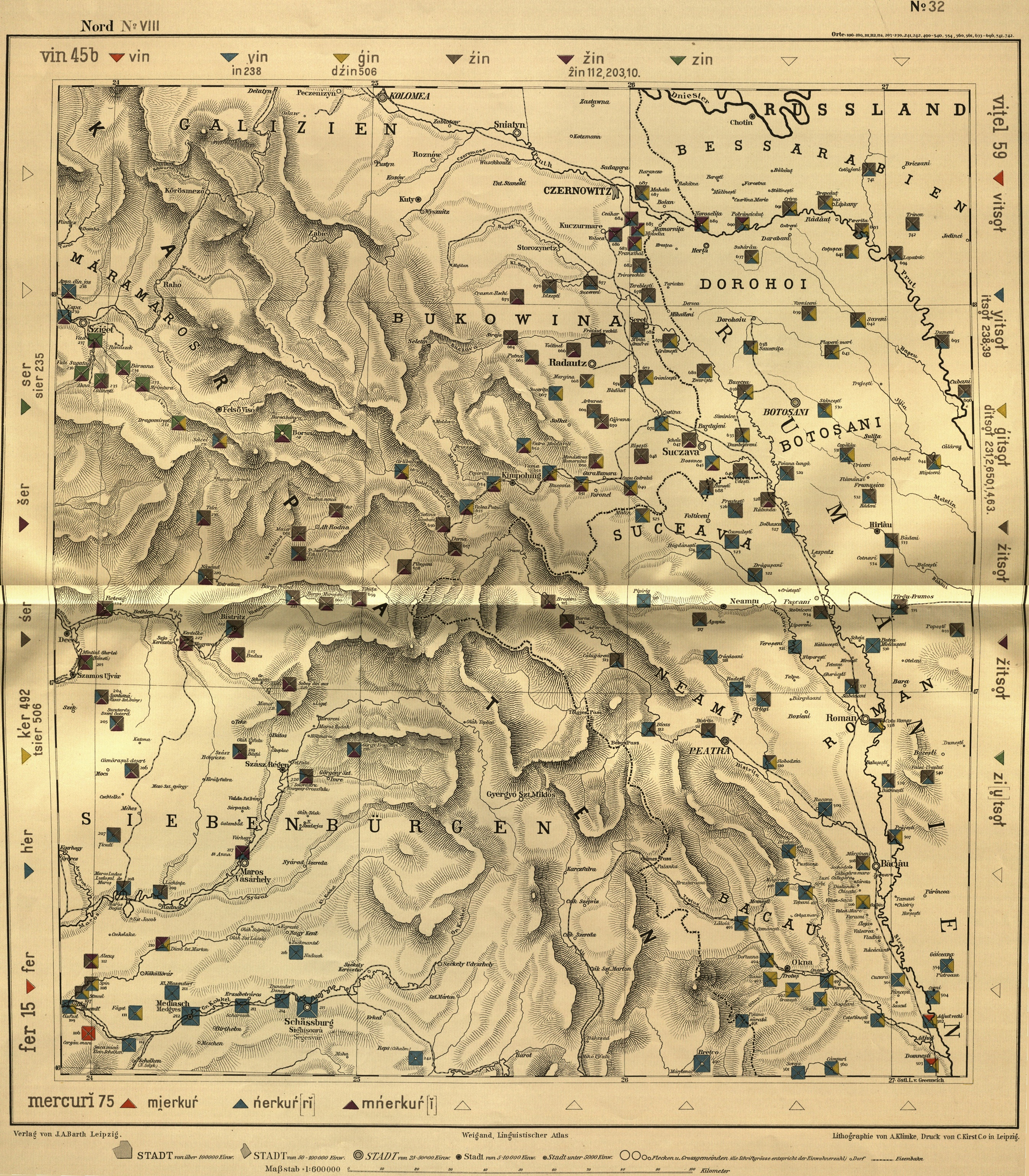

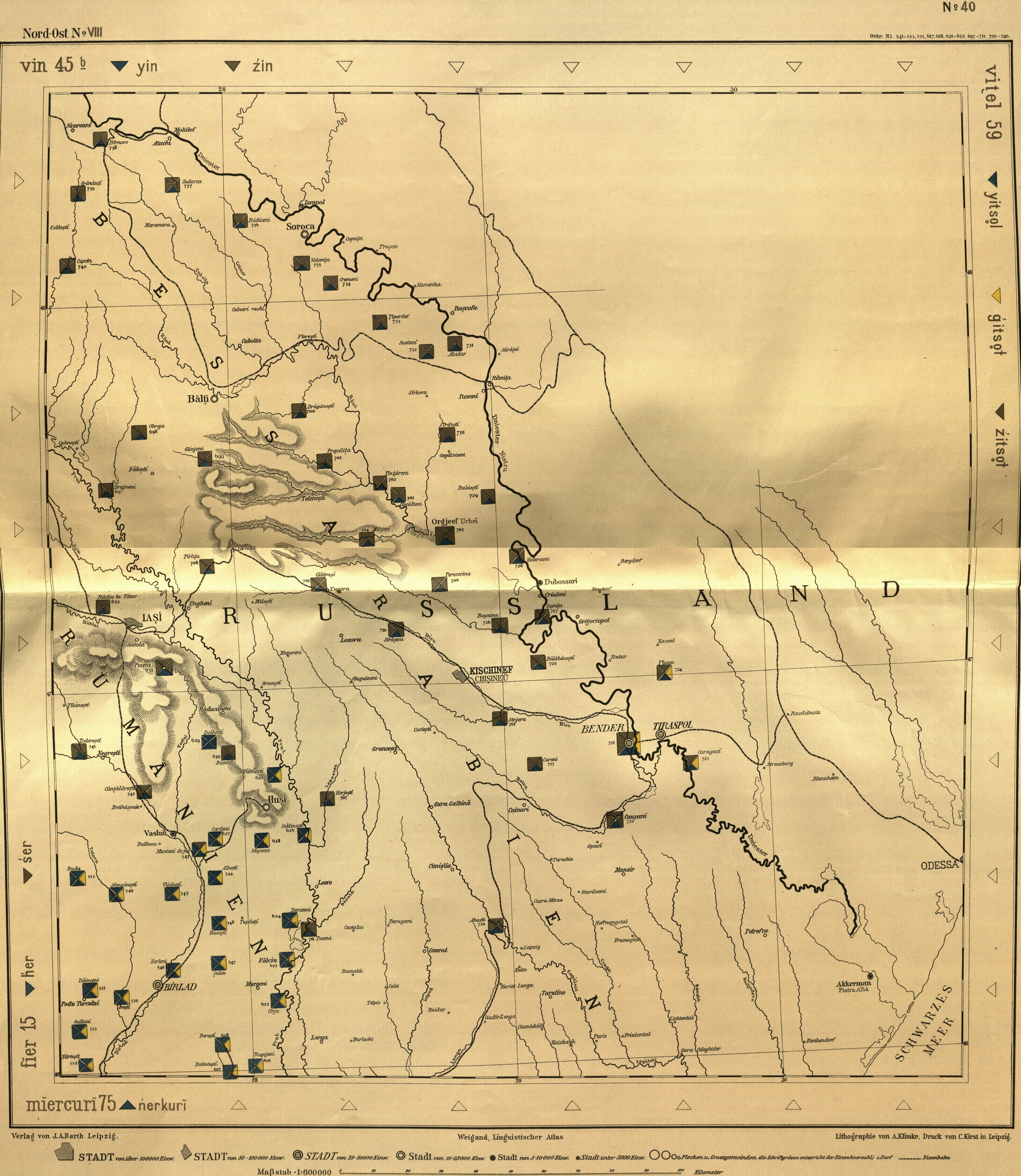

== See also ==
- Moldovan language
- Romanian dialects
- Romanian phonology

== Bibliography ==
- Vasile Ursan, "Despre configurația dialectală a dacoromânei actuale", Transilvania (new series), 2008, No. 1, pp. 77–85 (in Romanian)
- Spînu, Stela, "Graiurile româneşti din nord-estul Republicii Moldova", Chişinău, 2011
- Ilona Bădescu, "Dialectologie", teaching material for the University of Craiova.
- Elena Buja, Liliana Coposescu, Gabriela Cusen, Luiza Meseșan Schmitz, Dan Chiribucă, Adriana Neagu, Iulian Pah, Raport de țară: România, country report for the Lifelong Learning Programme MERIDIUM (in Romanian)
