= Gustav Weigand =

German philologist (1860–1930)

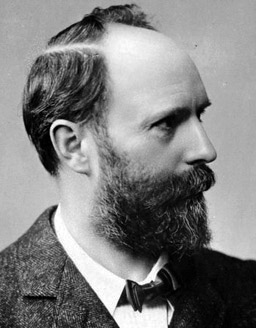
- Weigand in 1908
- Born: 1 February 1860; Duisburg, Kingdom of Prussia (now Germany)
- Died: 8 July 1930 (aged 70); Belgershain, Weimar Republic (now Germany)
- Known for: Contributions to Eastern Romance and Balkan linguistics

Academic background
- Education: Leipzig University

Gustav Weigand (1 February 1860 – 8 July 1930) was a German linguist and specialist in Balkan languages, especially Romanian and Aromanian. He is known for his seminal contributions to the dialectology of the Romance languages of the Balkans and to the study of the relationships between the languages of the Balkan sprachbund. He has also provided substantial contribution to Aromanian studies, an example of this being the discovery and publication of the contents of the Codex Dimonie.

Weigand was born in Duisburg, in the Rhine Province of Prussia. He studied Romance languages in Leipzig and wrote a doctoral thesis about the language of the Aromanians in Livadi in the region of Mount Olympus in 1888, followed by a habilitation thesis on the Megleno-Romanian language in 1892. In 1893 he founded the Romanian Institute at the University of Leipzig, the first such institution outside Romania. During the following years he continued to conduct extensive personal field studies in the Balkans. In 1908, he published a Linguistic Atlas of the Daco-Romanian speech area (German: Linguistischer Atlas des dacorumänischen Sprachgebiets), the first work of its kind in the field of Romance linguistics. During the First World War, he was sent by Imperial German authorities to conduct ethnographic studies in Macedonia, then under German occupation. The results were published in 1923.

In recognition of his research on the Romanian language, Gustav Weigand was elected as a foreign member of the Romanian Academy in 1892. He was also a foreign member of the Bulgarian Academy of Sciences and of the Macedonian Scientific Institute. He died in Belgershain.

== Major works ==
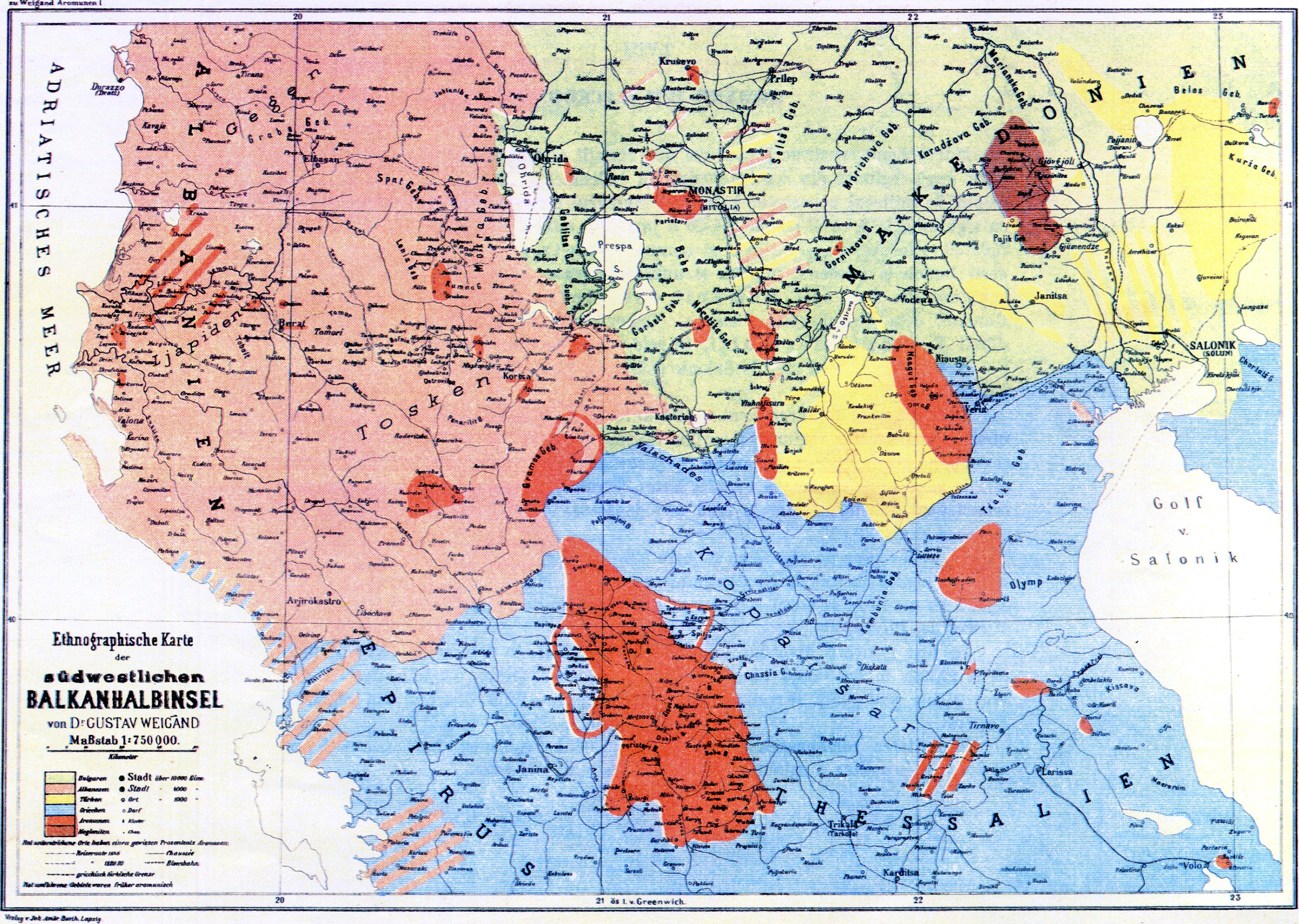
Ethnographic map of the Southwestern Balkan Peninsula by linguist Gustav Weigand (1890)

- (1888): Die Sprache der Olympo-Walachen. Johann Ambrosius Barth: Leipzig.
- (1892): Vlacho-Meglen. Eine ethnographisch-philologische Untersuchung. Leipzig.
- (1908): Linguistischer Atlas des dacorumänischen Sprachgebiets. Barth: Leipzig.
- (1923): Ethnographie Makedoniens. Leipzig.
