= Emil Petrovici =

Romanian linguist, dialectologist and Slavist

Emil Petrovici (Romanian pronunciation: [eˈmil ˈpetrovitʃʲ]; 1899–1968) was a Romanian linguist, dialectologist and Slavist. He studied both Romanian and Serbian languages. His studies included Romanian phonology, and Romanian, Serbian, and other Slavic dialectology.

Petrovici was born in the village of Torak (former Begejci), at the time part of Austria-Hungary, now in northern Serbia.

From 1949 to 1954, Petrovici worked on literary and cultural problems of Transylvania and collaborated on several journals published in Cluj. He was honored with membership in several scientific academies and societies, and was honored with various titles such as Om de știință emerit ("Emeritus scientist") and Premiul de stat ("The State Prize"). He died in the Bucerdea train collision in 1968.

== Works ==
Among his many books were:

- Despre nazalitate în limba română (On nasalization in the Romanian language)
- Graiul carașovenilor (Language of Krashovani)
- Folclor din Valea Almajului (Folklore from the Almajului Valley, 1935)
- Folclor de la moții din Scărișoara (Folklore of the Moţii of Scărişoara, 1939)
- Note de folclor de la românii din Valea Mlavei (Notes on the folklore of the Romanians of the Mlava Valley, 1942)
- Texte dialectale (Dialect Texts, Leipzig, 1943)
- Atlasul lingvistic român (Romanian Linguistic Atlas), co-authored
