= Modern Romanian =

Historical stage of the Romanian language

Modern Romanian (Romanian: română modernă) is the historical stage of the Romanian language starting at the end of the 18th century. The modern era comprises three distinct periods: the premodern period starting from 1780 and lasting until 1830, the modern period from 1830 until 1880, and the contemporary period after 1881. Modern Romanian is characterised by the development of the Romanian alphabet, initial Latin and Italian lexical entries, followed by the central role of French in the growth of the Romanian lexis, the development of literary styles, and standardisation.

History during this stage is fused with the blooming of Romanian literature, the influence of great writers often cited along the efforts of institutions, mainly the Romanian Academy, as the main standardisation factors.

Some researchers place the end of this last period between the end of Second World War and the beginning of the "Socialist Period", thus separating the current stage of the Romanian language from the Modern one.

== Pre-modern period ==
Since the 16th century, Romanian language has appeared in its literary form. The early books and texts, written with the Romanian Cyrillic alphabet, were predominantly religious or historical. Personalities such as Ion Neculce, Miron Costin, Dimitrie Cantemir, and Constantin Cantacuzino, influenced by Humanism, promoted the use of Romanian instead of the regular literary language, Old Church Slavonic. However, the Church language continued to influence religious writings, but writers, such as Archbishops Vaarlam and Dosoftei, were reserved in introducing the needed neologisms from it. The first influences on the modern lexicon came mostly from Latin, Greek, and Turkish, with an estimate of 850 words from Modern Greek entering the language during this period.

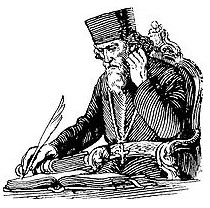
Samuil Micu Klein

The alphabet came under scrutiny initially in Transylvania where the main writing system used the Hungarian alphabet. The scholars of the Transylvanian School, educated in Catholic centers in Rome or Vienna, developed a writing system based on the Latin alphabet. These efforts were supported by a rich publishing activity, out of which the printing of the book Elementa linguae daco-romanae sive valachicae, written by Gheorghe Șincai and Samuil Micu-Klein was recognised as the divide between the old and the modern periods. However, due to differences between regions and social groups, the development of the written language into what is considered Modern Romanian was not immediate.

=== Latter Phanariot epoch ===
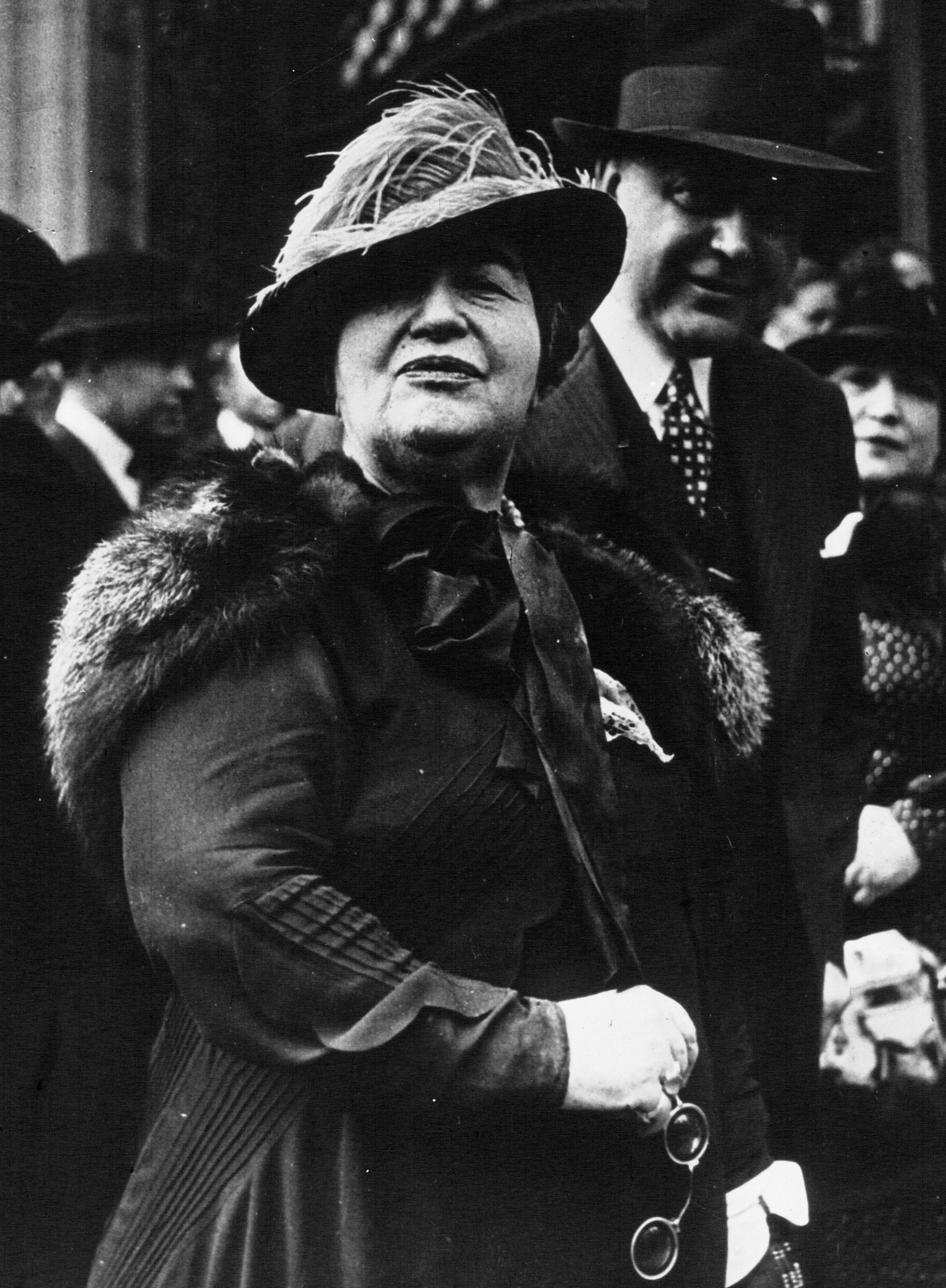
Elena Văcărescu in Paris, 1936. Descendant of the Văcărescu family, she was one of the many writers the aristocratic family gave since the late 18th century.

Between 1711–1716 and 1821, a number of Phanariots were appointed as Hospodars (voivodes or princes) in the Danubian Principalities (Moldavia and Wallachia); the period is known as the Phanariot epoch in Romanian history. The Greek dignitaries and their retinue brought with them significant Greek influence, mainly replacing Old Church Slavonic and Romanian as literary languages. However, the growing influence of French as a prestige language was felt at the conversational level among the educated, opening access to the West. In this context, early writers such as Ienăchiță Văcărescu, Dinicu Golescu, Costache Conachi developed a style combining these influences. Translations from Western writers, for example Vasile Pogor's translation of Voltaire's La Henriade, became more frequent with this generation.

=== Transylvanian School ===
The main contribution to the beginning of modern Romania was taken by the Transylvanian School, a current developed within the Romanian Greek Catholic Church community from the Hapsburg territory. "The Coryphaei" of this cultural movement, Micu-Klein, Gheorghe Șincai, Petru Maior and Ion Budai-Deleanu, took up the cause of representing Romanian political rights and appealed to the Latin origin of the people and language as the main argument. Within this context, they devised the early Romanian alphabet based on Latin and mainly on etymologising (Latinising) principles. A sample of text from Elementa linguae daco-romanae sive valachicae showing the etymologizing features compared to a Latin version:

Nu ê têmp se jáci în pat; scoala te, n'áuzi quum tuna ẛi trazneẛte/Non est tempus jacendi in lecto; eleva te, non audis que tonat et fulminat.

The influence of their writings expanded to the Romanian principalities, with the work of teachers such as Aaron Florian continuing the activity of Gheorghe Lazăr, another Romanian from Transylvania, spreading further to cultural figures of the early 19th century such as Ion Heliade Rădulescu and Nicolae Bălcescu.

=== Establishment as literary language ===
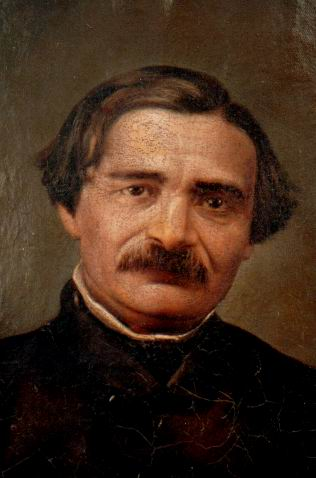
Ion Heliade Rădulescu (1802–1872)

The first decades of the 19th century brought romantic enthusiasm to Romanian culture. The period saw the rise and fall of the Filiki Eteria in the Danubian Principalities and with this event, the end of the Greek language branch of the Princely Academy of Bucharest. The Academy became Saint Sava Academy, the institution where Ion Heliade Rădulescu and Eufrosin Poteca promoted the usage of Romanian. Rădulescu was adept at introducing neologisms into the language, especially from Italian which he saw as a more modern cultural model than the Latin model, managed to break the monopoly on public press held by the authorities and published in 1829 Curierul Românesc with contributions from Heliade himself, Grigore Alexandrescu, Costache Negruzzi, Dimitrie Bolintineanu, Ioan Catina, Vasile Cârlova, and Iancu Văcărescu. A sample of text showcasing the etymologising writing used by Rădulescu:

Primi audi-vor quel sutteranu resunetu

Și primi salta-vor afara din grôpa

Sacri Poeți que prea ușôrâ țêrinâi

Copere, și quâror puțin d'uman picioarele împlumbâ.

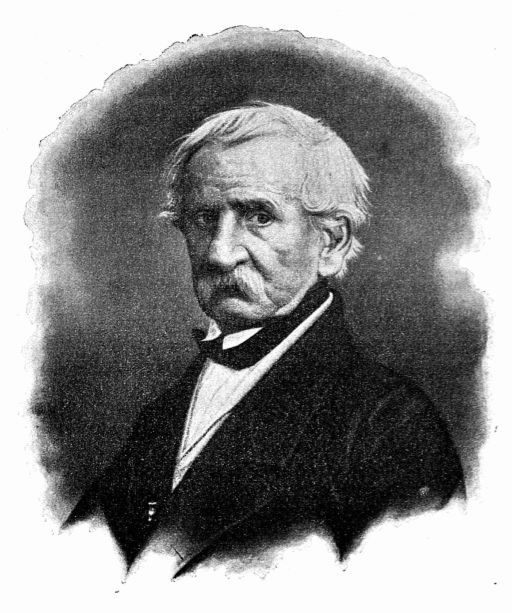
Gheorghe Asachi (1788–1869)

In Moldavia a similar endeavour was undertaken by Gheorghe Asachi, a friendly figure of the Transylvanian School, an opponent of the Phanariote regime, and an admirer of Petrarch and Moldavian chroniclers. Asachi oscillated between returning to the archaic language of the religious writings, which he saw as a solution to the confusing tendencies of modernising, and standardising the language, including the addition of neologisms by a single responsible institution. His political orientation towards Russia allowed him to become involved in the creation of the Moldavian Regulamentul Organic, a constitution-like set of laws during the Russian protectorate, and the publishing of the Romanian language magazine Albina Românească, the first of its kind in Moldavia. Asachi went on to publish the supplements Alăuta Românească (1837–1838) and Foaea Sătească a Prințipatului Moldovei (1839).

== Modern period ==
With the end of the Phanariote epoch, the adoption of the Regulamentul Organic, and the establishment of Romanian as the main literary language of Wallachia and Moldavia the transitional period ended. The modern period partly overlapped with what is called the Golden Age of Romanian literature. The drop in importance of Old Church Slavonic and the Church language, the reorientation towards other languages as cultural models with the effect of losing hundreds of words from Modern Greek and Turkish, the use of the Romanian transitional alphabet and the advent of French as the major language of influence during and after what is called the Pașoptist generation (in the semantic field of Modern World over 70% of them are from French) are the cumulative effects of the patchy process known as Re-Romanisation, Re-Latinisation, or Westernisation of Romanian language. Only about 10% of the Greek and Turkish loanwords remained in usage from the 19th century onward, according to linguist László Gáldi).

Historical events such as the 1848 Revolutions, the Crimean War, the Unification of Moldavia and Wallachia, and the Romanian War of Independence created favourable conditions for the adoption of the Romanian alphabet, the founding of universities in Iasi (1860) and Bucharest (1864), and the establishment of the Romanian Academic Society in 1866, which would then be later be renamed to the Romanian Academy.

=== The Pașoptist generation ===
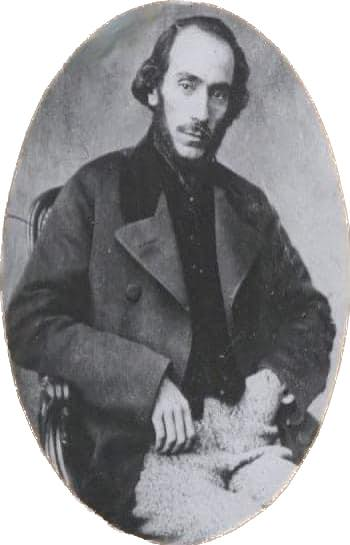
Nicolae Bălcescu

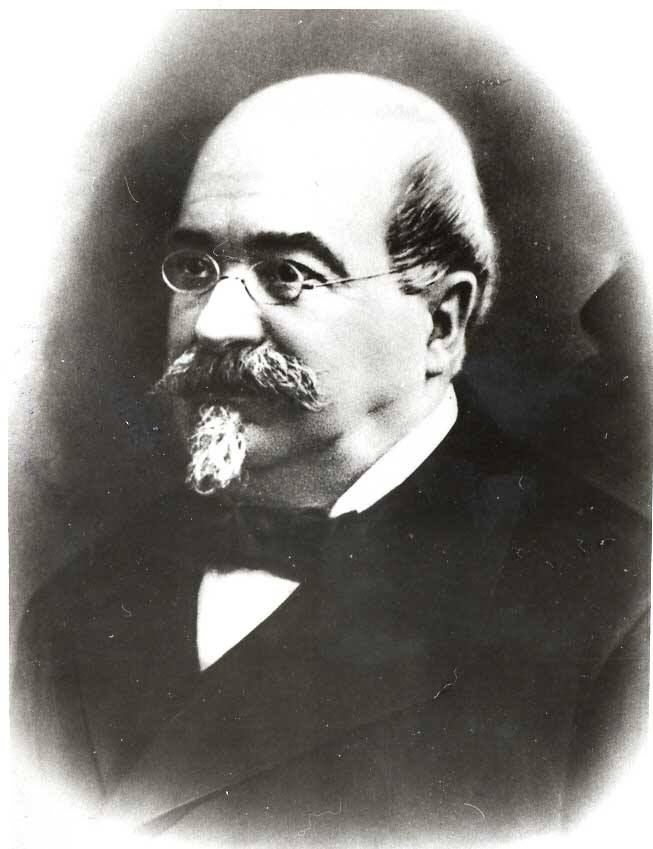
Mihail Kogălniceanu

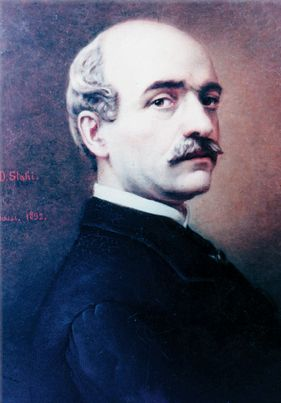
Vasile Alecsandri

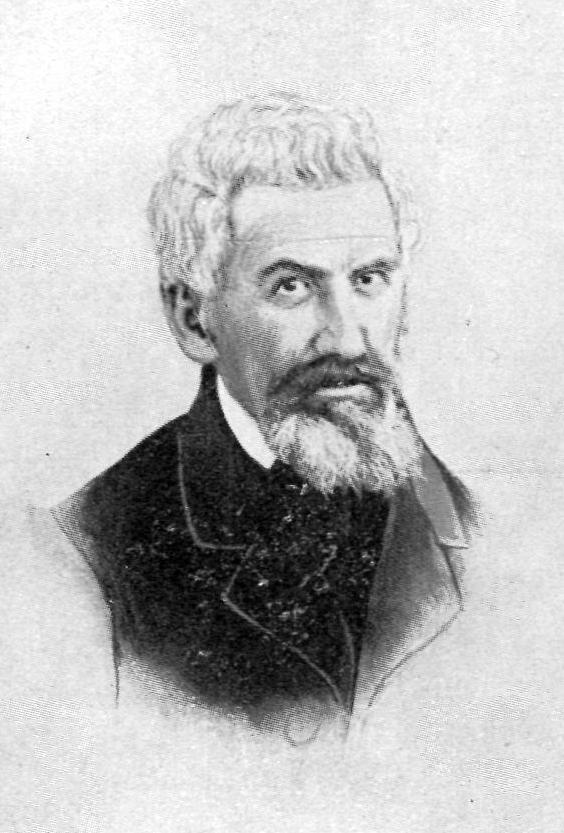
Timotei Cipariu

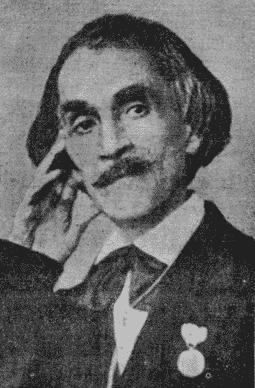
Grigore Alexandrescu

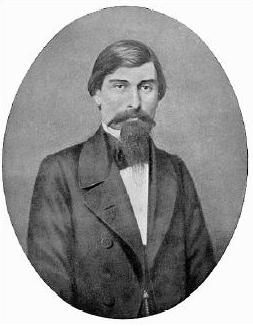
Alecu Russo

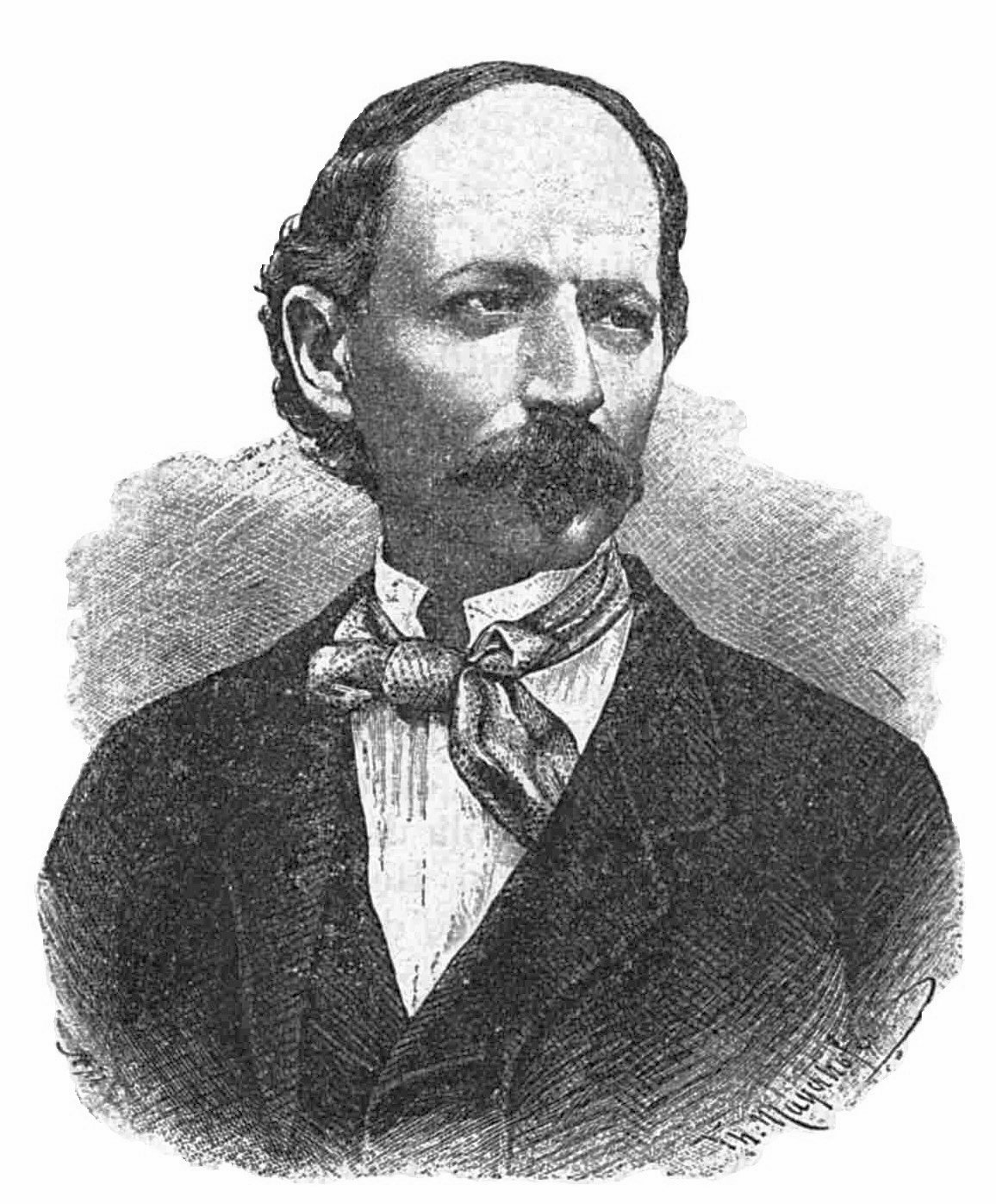
Dimitrie Bolintineanu

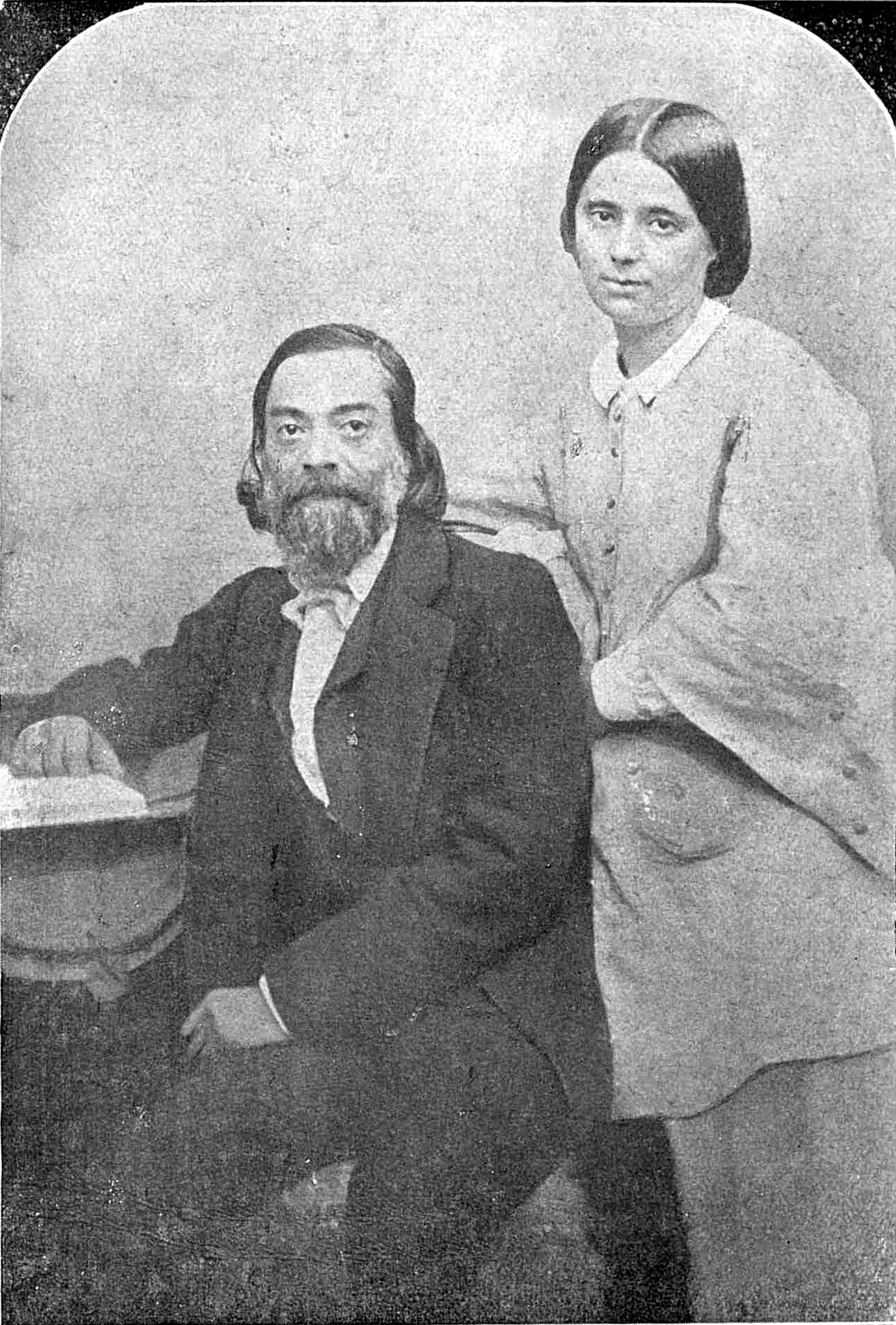
C. A. Rosetti and Maria Rosetti

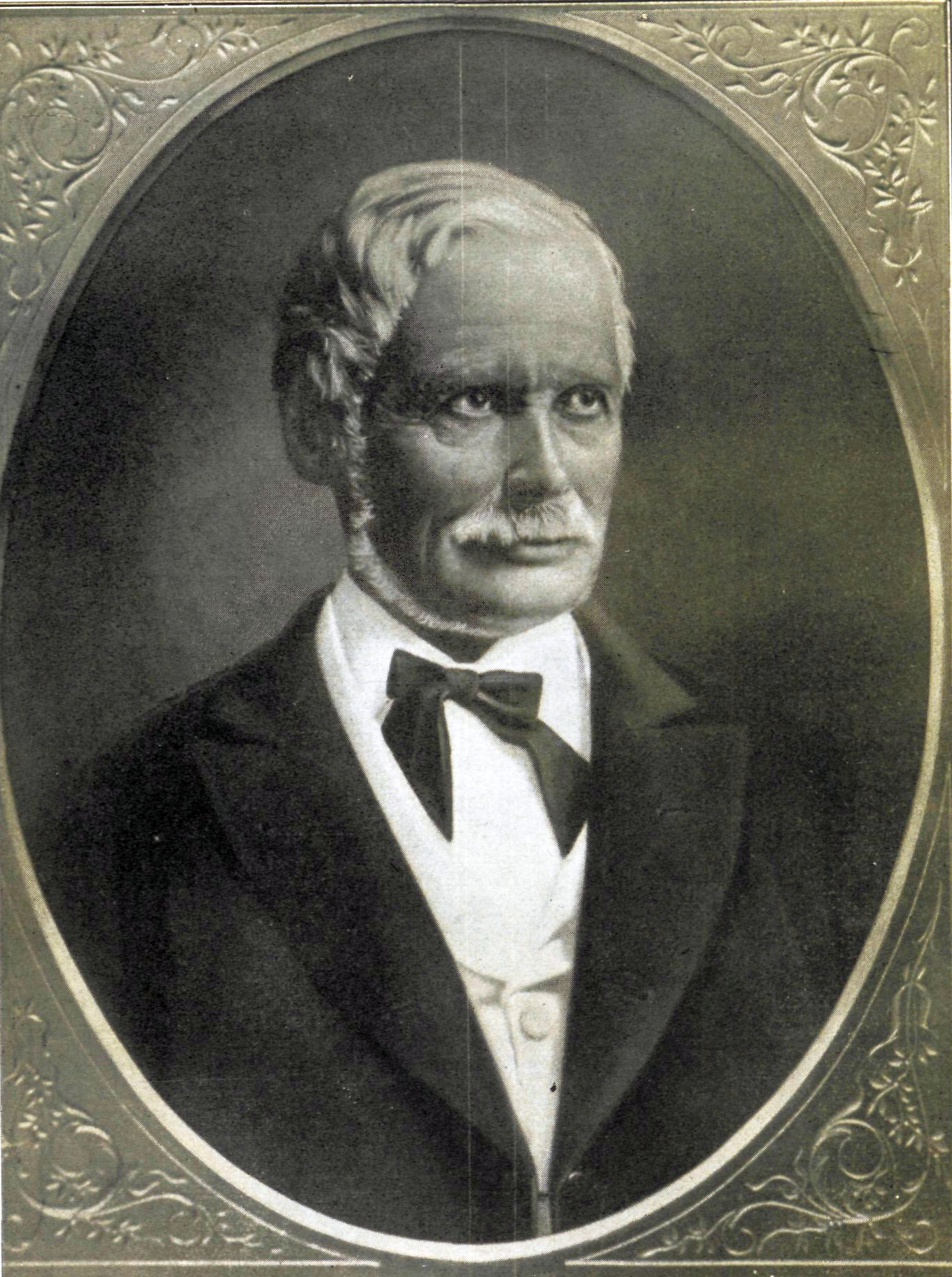
George Bariț

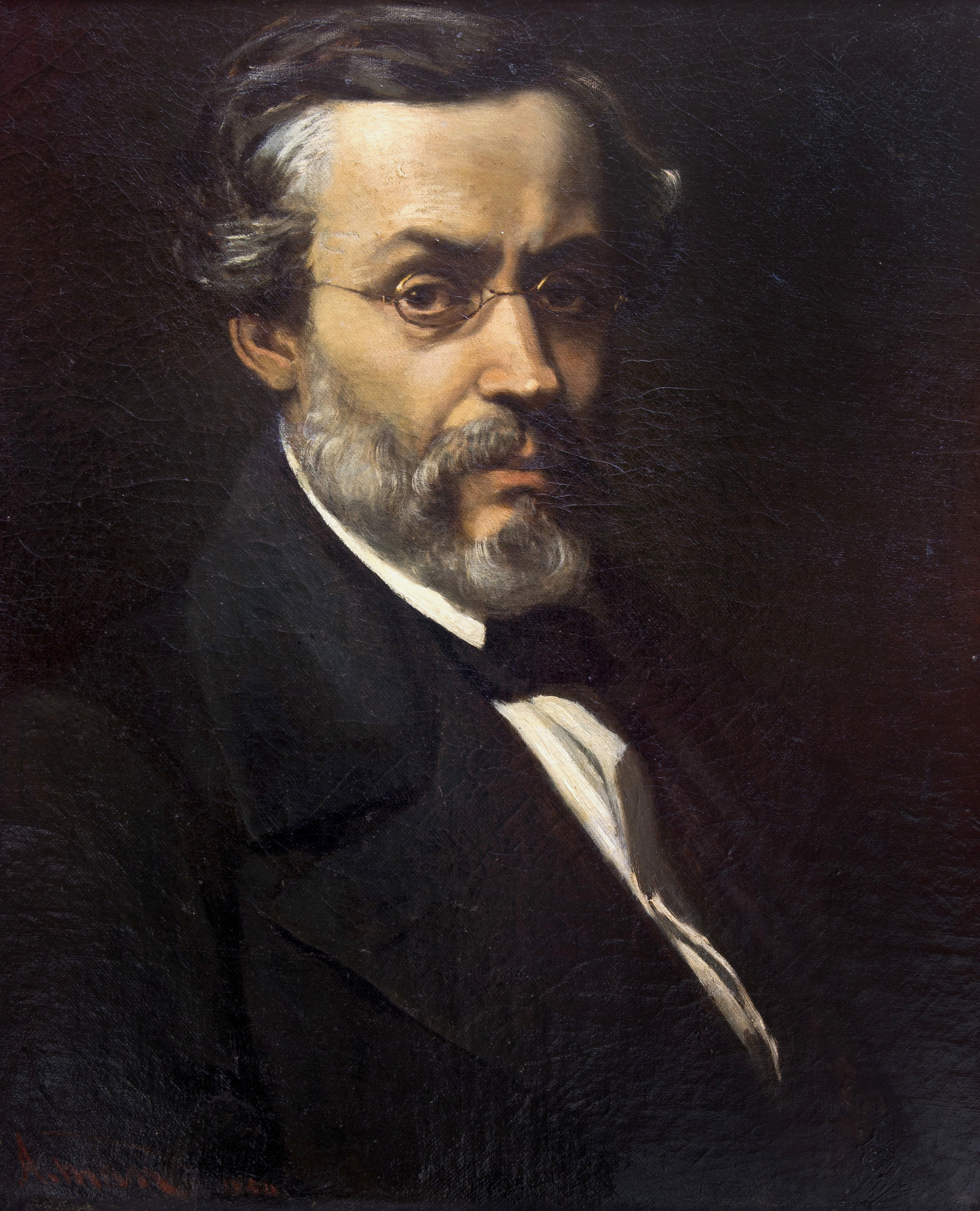
Cezar Bolliac

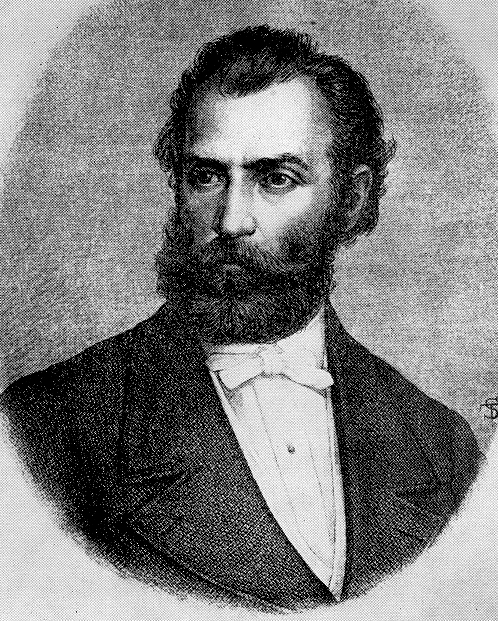
Alexandru Papiu-Ilarian

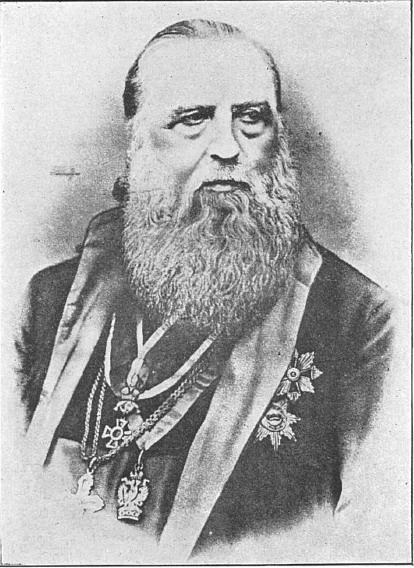
Andrei Șaguna

Although the modernising current was initially led by the aristocratic and educated personalities of the Danubian Principalities, the profound changes of the early 19th century allowed the middle-class bourgeoisie to participate more actively in cultural life. Educated at the schools and colleges of the older generation (Heliade's Saint Sava Academy or Asachi's Academia Mihăileană), they embraced the period's growing influence of French language and culture. This superseded the previous cultural models of Latin and Italian in the spoken language. The leaders of this generation were active during the 1848 Revolutions in Wallachia and Moldavia as well as participating in the events in the Habsburg Empire. The levelling effect of the French language in terms of lexical borrowing and the literary activities of personalities involved in the political life of all areas inhabited by Romanians brought the first signs of language standardisation.

One of the first to take up the new ideas of the French Revolution and Romantic Nationalism was Nicolae Bălcescu, a former student of Aaron Florian and Ion Heliade Rădulescu, and a leading member of the French-based association of Romanian students from both Principalities presided by Alphonse de Lamartine. His main publishing activity was in collaboration with August Treboniu Laurian at Magazin istoric pentru Dacia. His impact came from his political activities and the posthumously published Românii sub Mihai Vodă Viteazul in 1860 by Alexandru Odobescu, both imbued with a vision of the unity of all Romanians and implicitly the Romanian language.

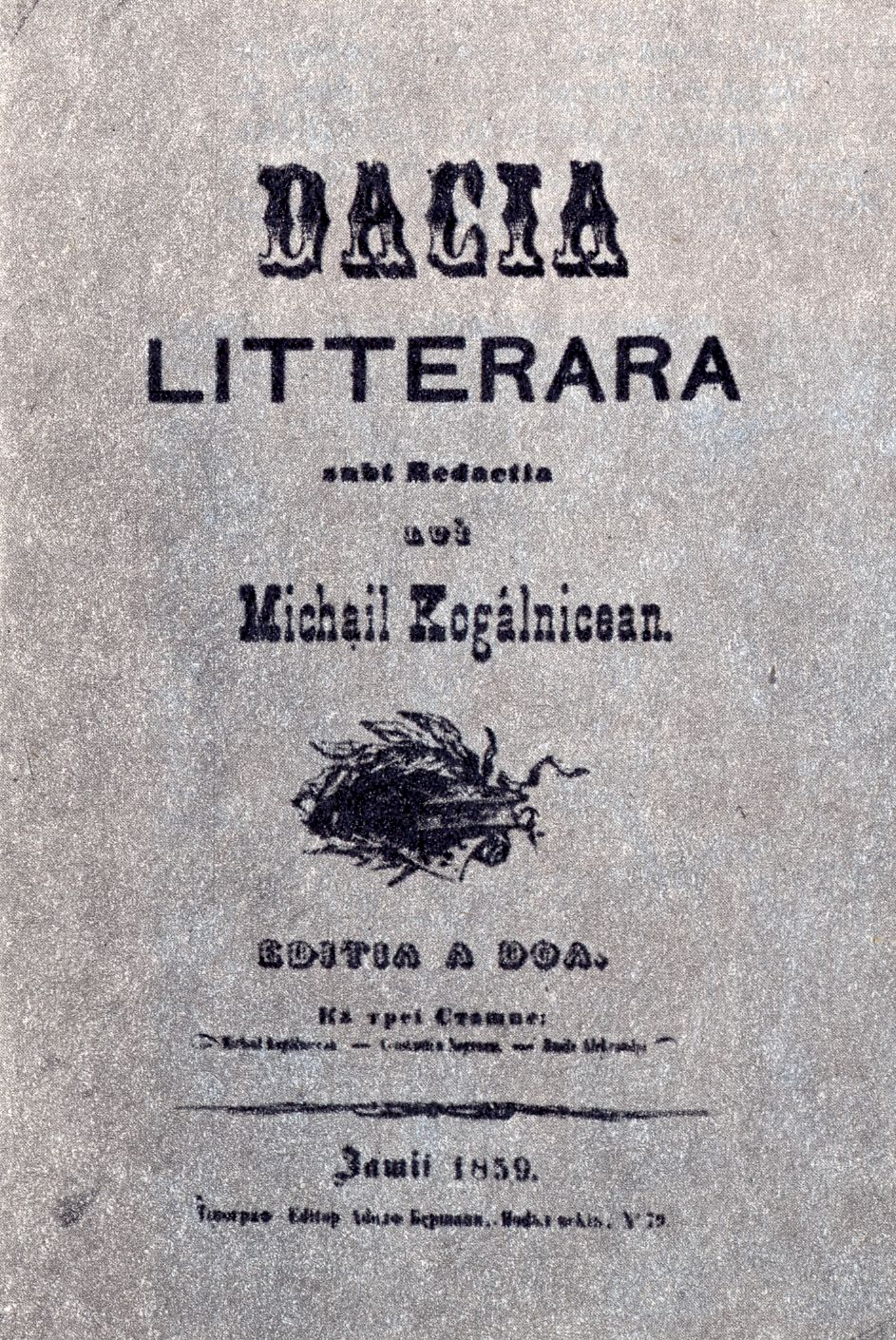
Dacia Literară, published during 1840 by Mihail Kogălniceanu (1817–1891)

Mihail Kogălniceanu started his literary activity in Alăuta Românească, the supplement to the Moldavian magazine Albina Românească. He initiated in 1840 the first literary magazine, Dacia Literară, then Propășirea later renamed Foaie Științifică și Literară. Kogălniceanu's role in combating nationalist excesses, in particular the post-1840 attempts by Transylvanian and Wallachian intellectuals to change the fabric of the Romanian language by introducing influences from Latin or other modern Romance languages was recognised by Garabet Ibrăileanu.

Vasile Alecsandri, one of the most prolific writers of this generation, drew inspiration from folkloric material and adapted it into his work through a Romantic perspective. His literary style, difficult to pin down to one of the cultural currents of his century, influenced generations after, including the late 19th century poet Mihai Eminescu. Like Kogălniceanu, he was less receptive to the previous generation's proposals of modernising the language, looking to adopt features of the Wallachian style into his own–a process initiated by Constantin Negruzzi before him, which by mid-century had an effect on Wallachian scholars who reciprocated the gesture.

The Pașoptist current had its critics, although limited in number and quality. The Bonjuriști (from French bonjour) were opposed by what Călinescu called the Antibonjuriști.

=== The transitional alphabet ===
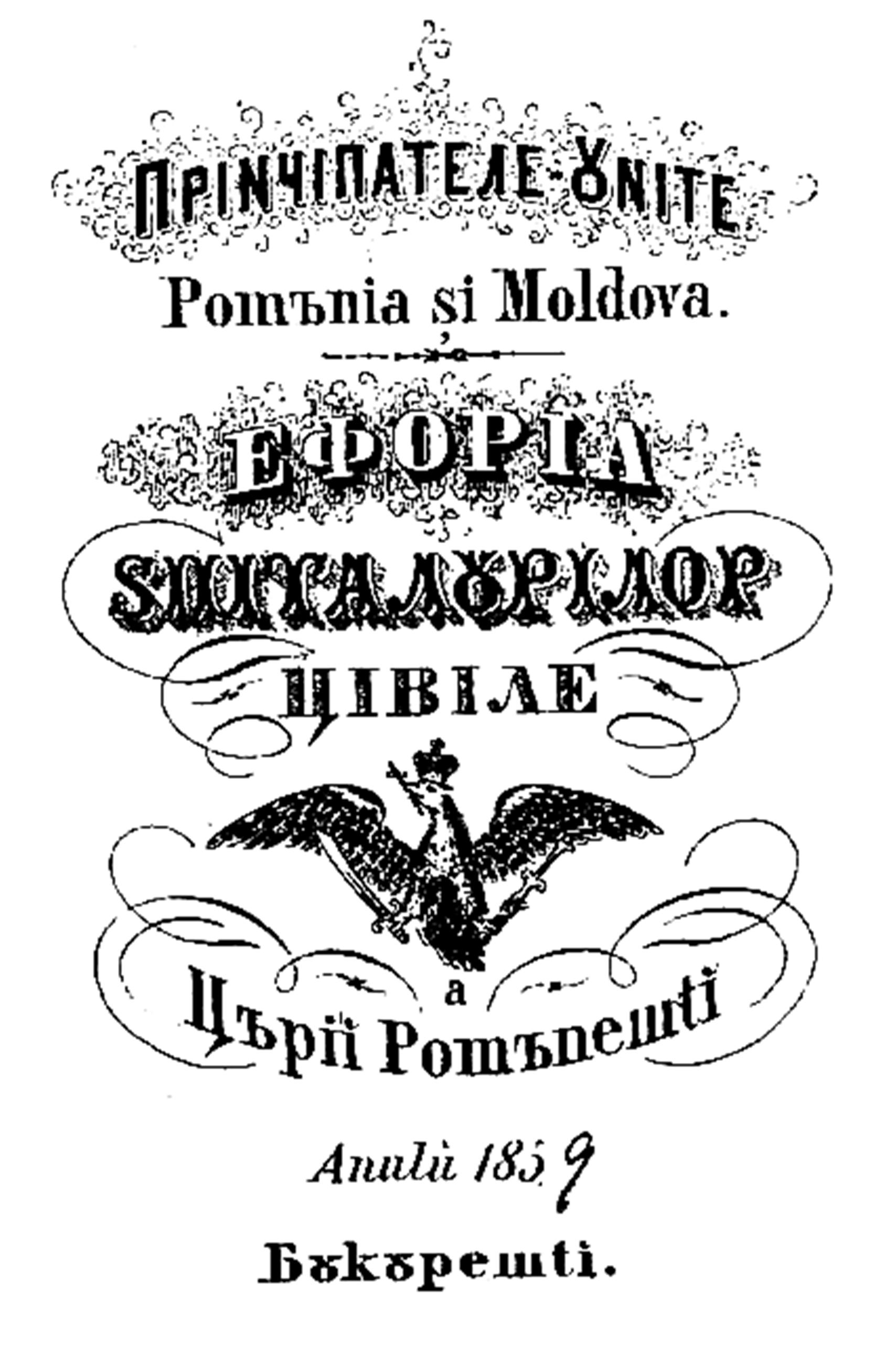
Letterhead of the Public Hospitals Administrations in Bucharest, Romania, in use shortly after the personal union between Wallachia and Moldavia

The Romanian Transitional Alphabet also known as the civil alphabet was used between 1828 and 1859. The idea belonged to Ion Heliade Rădulescu who made it public in his 1828 Gramatica românească. The old Cyrillic alphabet had 43 letters and, as scholars like Ienăchiță Văcărescu before him noticed, not all had a clear use in Romanian. Rădulescu proposed a list of 29 letters: А, Б, В, Д, Г, Ԑ, Ж, Є, Ӡ, Ї, К, Л, М, И, О, П, Р, С, Т, Ꙋ, Ф, Ц, Х, Ч, Ш, Щ, Ъ, Џ, Ѱ, Ѵ, which he identified as useful for his students. However, even in his own publication Curierul românesc from 1829 and 1830 many of the rejected letters reappeared. The difficulty of putting in practice the transitional alphabet would last a few more years until in the same magazine, in 1835, the letters Î, R, S and Z replaced their Cyrillic equivalents. Another attempt four years later added hybrid letters combining Latin and Cyrillic features. In 1844 the editors published Curierul de ambe sexe with Latin characters only.

Elsewhere, in 1840 the first page of Iordache Golescu's Băgări de seamă asupra canoanelor gramăticești presented no less than 4 alphabets, and within the text the Cyrillic and Latin letters alternated. Kogălniceanu's Dacia literară and Propășirea had a moderate transitional alphabet, using the Latin D, E, M, N, Z. Only in 1855 România literară were the letters Î, J, S, T added. The Transylvanian Foaie pentru minte, inimă și literatură and Gazeta de Transilvania, edited by Bariț and Cipariu, had the first page printed with Latin letters, then the following in transitional alphabet, sometimes alternating from Latin to Cyrillic from one page to another. In 1856 in Wallachia a law decreed the use of the Latin alphabet for schools and manuals, but retained the letter Ъ. Finally, on 8 February 1860, Ion Ghica decreed the use of the Latin alphabet in Wallachia, a model followed two years later by Moldavia.

=== Founding of advanced education institutions ===
The earliest schools teaching in Romanian had their roots in the Princely Academies of Wallachia and Moldavia where the Greek language teaching branch was seconded by a Romanian language one. After the end of the Phanariote epoch the Romanian language branch remained the only one in use. Although named "academies", the two institutions—Saint Sava Academy in Bucharest and Academia Mihăileană from Iași—offered only college level education. Those looking for higher education had to study abroad, mainly in France where hundreds of the so-called Pașoptist generation intellectuals did or in major university centres of Central Europe such as Vienna or Kraków. With the unification of Wallachia and Moldavia and the introduction of the Latin-based alphabet the stage was set for the establishment of advanced education. From the two academies, by decree of Alexandru Ioan Cuza, the University of Iași was founded on 26 October 1860 and the University of Bucharest on 4 July 1864. In Transylvania the first university was founded in 1872, called Hungarian Royal Franz-Joseph University, but due to Magyarization policies Romanian was not a language of education. However, a chair for Romanian language and literature was permitted. The structure and model of the Romanian language institutions was inspired or implemented on a French system. Several Romanian language schools were established in Macedonia to support the language.

=== Romanian Academy ===
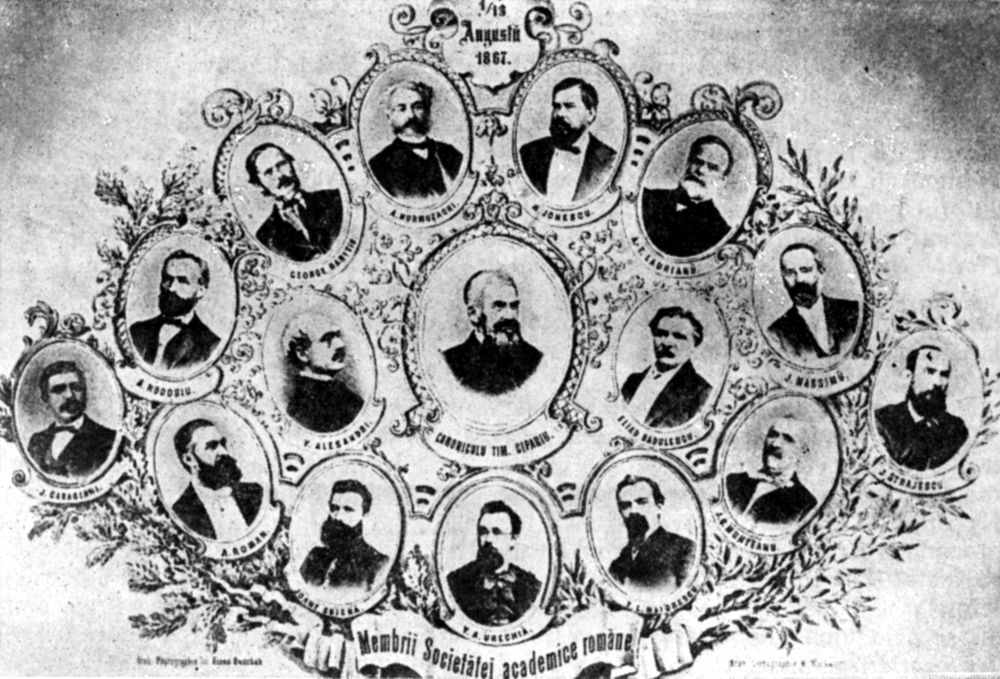
"Societatea Academică Română" meaning Romanian Academic Society, was the name used initially by the Romanian Academy

A few years after the introduction of advanced educational institutions, the main academic forum was established. Several scholars are credited with the idea or the continuous support for the creation of a single forum, among them Gheorghe Asachi, the leading figure of early Moldavian education, and Ion Heliade Rădulescu a leader in the development of Modern Romanian. The formal proposal was made and fulfilled by C. A. Rosetti, then the minister of Public Instruction, and in April 1866 the Societatea Academică Română was created. The institution became the main stage for the academic debate between etymologising (Latinising) and broadly phonemic approaches to standards of writing. Tendencies in writing such as Timotei Cipariu's noting of letters Ă, Î, Ș, and Ț with Latin characters without comma or Rădulescu's proposal of writing /k/ as qu, é and ó for /ea/ and /oa/ diphthongs were debated and in 1869 the society decided in favour of Rădulescu's system. Only in 1881 did the Academy opt in favour of the phonemic principle.

The use of Modern Romanian in these institutions, along with the literary forms and neologisms, created an intellectual style adapted to the reality of its time. Words like benign, cotidian, decență, depravare, impecabil, rural, rustic, urban took precedence in the higher cultural language before the mundane blând, zilnic, cuviință, desfrânare, fără cusur, țărănesc, sătesc, orășenesc, a tendency that continued in contemporary usage.

== See also ==
- Modern English
