= Supplex Libellus Valachorum =

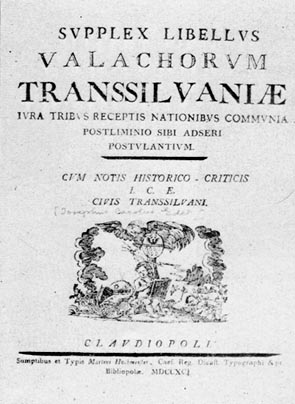
First page of the petition, printed in Klausenburg (today's Cluj-Napoca, Romania)

Supplex Libellus Valachorum Transsilvaniae (Latin for Petition of the Romanians of Transylvania) is the name of two petitions sent by the leaders of the ethnic Romanians of Transylvania to the Holy Roman Emperor Leopold II, demanding equal political rights with the other ethnicities of Transylvania and a share of the Transylvanian Diet proportional to their population.

The first Supplex was sent in March 1791 by Ignațiu Darabant, the Greek Catholic bishop of Oradea, to the State Council of Vienna. The second Supplex, a largely expanded and argumented version of the first, was brought before the Imperial Court of Vienna on March 30, 1792, by Ioan Bob, Greek Catholic bishop of Blaj, and by Gherasim Adamovici, Orthodox bishop of Transylvania.

The demands in the petition, according to the researches of David Prodan, were largely based on the Declaration of the Rights of Man and of the Citizen of Revolutionary France, and it also included an essay reviewing historical reasons (such as references to a Roman Dacia-Romanian continuity) as well as statistics about the Romanians (who made up approximately 55% of the population of Transylvania). According to some more recent researches, the argumentation of the Supplex Libellus Valachorum based on the ideas of natural law as well as on the Hungarian feudal judicial argumentation. In any case the petition brought in favour of its requests among others, the argument that the rights of Romanians and Hungarians were melded together from the reign of Töhötöm as alleged in the 12th century Gesta Hungarorum.

The document was drafted by the most important representatives of the Romanians of Transylvania (which were, for the most part, clerics of the Romanian Greek Catholic Church): Samuil Micu, Petru Maior, Gheorghe Șincai, Ioan Piuariu-Molnar, Iosif Meheși, Ion Budai-Deleanu, Ioan Para etc. The petition was signed in the name of the Romanian nation by its free categories: Clerus, Nobilitas, Civicusque Status Universae Nationis in Transilvania Valachicae.

The Supplex was rejected during the negotiations in the National Assembly where they discussed not so much the concept and reasoning of public law contained in the Supplex libellus Valachorum, but the issues contained in the royal transcript, and in response to them the following was established:

- In counties and Székely chairs, the rights and duties of nobles, freemen and serfs are determined not by nationality, but by orderly affiliation, therefore it is not possible to grant additional rights to Romanians. As for the King's Land, the privileges of the Saxons granted in the Andreanum would be violated by the extra rights of the Romanians; the discussion of this was postponed at the request of the Saxons.
- The free exercise of religion by Greek Catholics has been ensured since 1744, a separate bill will be drafted on the Orthodox.
- Since each Transylvanian denomination maintains its own clergy, the same must be done for the two Romanian denominations.
- The main reason for the ineptitude of the Romanian people is the backwardness of their own priests, to change this, the church commission is preparing a proposal for the next national assembly.

As such, the status of the Romanians remained unaltered. Several such petitions were issued in the following decades, and they all met with the same reaction. Another major petition, the Transylvanian Memorandum, was drafted a century later (in 1892, following the new circumstances after the 1848 Revolution and the Ausgleich), but its authors were sent to prison for treason.

== Sources ==
- David Prodan, Supplex Libellus Valachorum, Bucharest, 1948.
- Aron Kovacs, Continuity and Discontinuity in Transylvanian Romanian Thought: An Analysis of Four Bishopric Pleas from the Period between 1791 and 1842. In.: Hungarian Historical Review 5, no. 1 (2016): 46–72.
