= Nicolae Ianovici =

Aromanian linguist

- Born: Moscopole, Ottoman Empire
- Occupation: Linguist
- Known for: The publication of a dictionary of five languages, including Aromanian

Nicolae Ianovici (also Ioanovici) was an Aromanian linguist. He is known for the compilation of a dictionary of five languages, including Aromanian. Ianovici was one of the figures of the early Aromanian national movement in Vienna and Budapest.

== Biography ==
Nicolae Ianovici was from Moscopole, then in the Ottoman Empire and now in Albania. He originated from the Căliva (or Kaliva) family, originally from Moscopole but later settled in Timișoara (in the Habsburg monarchy, now in Romania). To this family also belonged Gheorghe Ioanovici, who became a prominent politician in Hungary. Nicolae Ianovici left for Timișoara and lived in the city for a short period of time, later moving to Pest (the eastern half of modern Budapest, Hungary). Ianovici was one of the Aromanian figures of the early 19th century in Vienna (Austria) and Budapest who contributed to the effort for the national awakening of the Aromanians. In Budapest, other such figures included Mihail G. Boiagi and Gheorghe Constantin Roja.

His contributions to the Aromanian cause consisted on the compilation of a dictionary in two volumes with 1302 pages in total, titled Diccionariu tru cinci limbe: ellinescu, grecescu, rumanescu, nemcescu shii madsarescu ("Dictionary for Five Languages: Hellenic, Greek, Aromanian, German and Hungarian"). In the preface of the dictionary, Ianovici argued for the importance and necessity of his work, aimed for public use by Aromanians and for the cultural development between the speakers of all the languages compiled in his dictionary. It was also of relevance to merchants in the Habsburg monarchy and in the Balkans. In the preface of the dictionary, Ianovici makes use of the endonym ramanu for "Aromanian". This is typical of the Farsherot dialect spoken in modern Albania, suggesting that Ianovici belonged to the subgroup of Farsherot Aromanians.

It is noticed that Ianovici was influenced by the Transylvanian School, a Romanian cultural and intellectual movement active in Habsburg and Austrian Transylvania at the time. Thus, just like the Romanian writer of the Transylvanian School Petru Maior stated that the origin of the Romanians was the Roman Empire and that the Romanian language came from Latin, so did Ianovici note the Roman and Latin origin of the Aromanians and of their language. In the preface, Ianovici also refers to the Aromanians as "Romanians beyond the Danube"; the Transylvanian School held the stance that the Romanians and the Aromanians were part of the same ethnic group.

Despite its approval for publication by its censor Gheorghe Petrovici in 1821, Ianovici's dictionary was for some reason not printed in the printing house of Buda (most of the western half of modern Budapest). Today, Ianovici's dictionary is in possession of the Romanian Academy.
