= Re-latinization of Romanian =

Process active during the Modern period of Romanian language

The re-latinization of Romanian (also known as re-romanization) was the reinforcement of the Romance features of the Romanian language that happened in the 18th and 19th centuries. Romanian adopted a Latin-based alphabet to replace the Cyrillic script and borrowed many words from French as well as from Latin and Italian, in order to acquire the lexical tools necessary for modernization. This deliberate process coined words for recently introduced objects or concepts (neologisms), added Latinate synonyms for some Slavic and other loanwords, and strengthened some Romance syntactic features. Some linguistic researchers emphasize that the use of this term is inappropriate as it conflates the larger process of modernization of the language with the more extreme, and in the end unsuccessful, current of eliminating non-Latin influences, and, secondly, the term's lack of precision is susceptible to lead to confusion as the Latin character of the Romanian language had already been noticed since at least the 15th century.

== Background ==
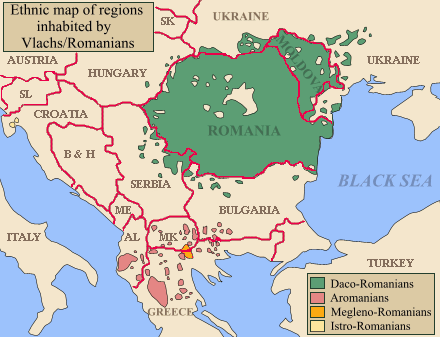
Geographical distribution of the four Eastern Romance languages in the early-20th-century

Romanian is a Romance language with about 25 million native speakers. It is the official language of Romania and Moldova and has a co-official status in Vojvodina (in Serbia). Ethnic Romanians also live in Ukraine and Hungary. Significant Romanian diasporas developed in other European countries (especially in Italy and Spain) and in North America, Australia and Israel. Romanian is closely related to three other Eastern Romance languages, Aromanian, Megleno-Romanian and Istro-Romanian, all descending from a common Proto-Romanian language. Romanian is divided into two main dialects, with a northern dialect spoken in Moldavia, northern Transylvania, Maramureș and Banat, and a southern dialect in Wallachia, but transitional variants also exist in Oltenia and Transylvania.

The origin of the Romanians is still subject to scholarly debates. The core of the debate is the continuous presence of the Romanians in the lands now forming Romania north of the Lower Danube. Scholars who propose that the Roman province of Dacia Trajana (which existed to the north of the river for about 165 years) was an important venue of the Romanians' ethnogenesis accept the continuity north of the Danube, a theory also supported by scholars who consider that the origins of the Romanians included territories located not only in Dacia, but also in areas south of the Danube (which were under Roman rule for centuries). Scholars who refute these theories propose that the ethnogenesis of the Romanians started in the south-Danubian provinces and the Romanians' ancestors did not settle in the lands to the north of the Lower Danube before the 11th century.

Romanian developed in territories which were isolated from other Romance languages for more than a thousand years. This geographic isolation gave rise to the development of a number of specific features. For instance, palatalized dental consonants (especially "z") replaced the non-palatalized consonants in verbs. The number of Romanian words directly inherited from Latin (about 1,550–2,000, depending on the source) is similar to the other Romance languages, and is low in comparison with Medieval Greek (which contained about 3,000 Latin roots). Romanian along with Spanish and Portuguese retained more archaic lexical items from Latin than other Romance languages, most probably due to their peripheral position. For instance, the classical Latin word for beautiful (formosus) can still be detected in Romanian frumos, Portuguese formoso and Spanish hermoso, but it was replaced by terms deriving from another Latin word, bellus in French (beau) and Italian (bello).

Romanian shares linguistic features with the non-Romance languages of the Balkan Peninsula, which gave rise to the idea of a "Balkan linguistic union". There are some further common features of Albanian and Romanian. Scholars assume that Albanian was closely related to the likely Thracian or Thraco-Dacian substrate languages, whose Romanization gave rise to the development of Romanian, or descends from it. Slavic languages influenced the development of Romanian for centuries. Romanian borrowed hundreds of words from Slavic languages and Slavic influence can be detected in Romanian phonology and morphology. Romanians also adopted Old Church Slavonic as the language of liturgy together with the Cyrillic script. In addition to Slavic influence Romanian borrowed words from other neighbouring languages such as Hungarian or Greek. The latter had a strong influence during the Phanariot era over Wallachia and Moldavia, with numerous words entering the southern sub-dialects. Of these only about 10% remained in usage from the 19th century onward, according to linguist László Gáldi.

Flavio Biondo was the first scholar to have observed (in 1435) linguistic affinities between the Romanian and Italian languages, as well as their common Latin origin. When comparing Romanian with other Romance languages, linguists noticed its peculiarities which can be detected at all linguistic levels. Some scholars even believed that Romanian was a Slavic language. In the early 19th century, the Slovene linguist, Jernej Kopitar, suggested that Romanian emerged through the relexification either of an ancient Balkan language or of a Slavic idiom, instead of directly developing from Vulgar Latin. Paul Wexler published a similar hypothesis in 1997. Linguist Anthony P. Grant writes that Wexler's hypothesis is not "completely convincing", stating that the "rise of Romanian still seems to be a case of language shift, analogous to the rise of English in England", with the Romanian's substratum equivalent to British Celtic, the Balkan Latin stratum similar to Anglo-Saxon, and the South Slavic superstratum equivalent to the Norman French role. Linguist Posner attributed to Friedrich Diez, who was one of the first German scholars systematically studying Romance philology, the opinion of Romanian ("Wallachian") being a semi-Romance language in the early 19th century. In his Grammar of the Romance Languages (1836) Diez retains six languages of the Romance area which attract attention, in terms of their grammatical or literary significance: Italian and Romanian, Spanish and Portuguese, Provençal and French. All six languages have their first and common source in Latin, a language which is 'still intertwined with our civilization'. Harald Haarmann considers that any discussion about the position of Romanian within the Romance philology was definitely decided with the Grammar of Diez. After the publication of his Grammar of the Romance Languages, Romanian is always listed among the Romance languages. Schippel observes that since Friedrich Diez' Grammar, the Romance character of Romanian wasn't seriously doubted. Werner Bahner concludes that “since the second half of the 19th century the Romance character of the Romanian has to be regarded as an absolutely certain knowledge” as „from the outset Romanian was considered a Romance language”. As linguist Graham Mallinson emphasizes, "Romanian in its various forms retains enough of its Latin heritage at all linguistic levels to qualify for membership of the Romance family in its own right".

The re-latinization evolved differently in the Romanian-populated areas. In Wallachia and Moldavia from 1760 to 1820–1830 the lexical influence of French and New Greek was the most influential, while in the Banat and Transylvania the Romanian language adopted words mainly from Latin and German languages. After 1830 the French language became the main source of the borrowings.

When derivations of the Latin type-words are taken into account, research shows that “the proportion of the resulting group in the total vocabulary of Romanian remains, with nearly 80% of types-words in the dictionaries, about the same from the texts of 16/17th centuries to present Romanian”, concluding that “the vocabulary of Old Romanian is as Romanic as the vocabulary of the modern Romanian language”.

== Terminology ==
Relatinization, as linguist Franz Rainer defines it, covers "not only borrowings from Latin at all its stages, including medieval and Neo-Latin, but also latinate formations taken from other European languages". This process can be detected during the history of all Romance languages. In Romanian scholarship, Alexandru Graur seems to have used the term relatinizare for the first time in an article in 1930, referring to the French influence on the development of the Romanian language. A year later, Sextil Pușcariu proposed a new term, reromanizare, most probably because he wanted to cover both the direct borrowings from Latin and of the borrowings from Romance languages. In 1978, Alexandru Niculescu opted for the label occidentalizare romanică ("Romance Westernization"), while Vasile D. Țâra described the process in 1982 as the "Latin-Romance direction in the modernization of the Romanian literary language".

Linguist Maria Aldea emphasizes that the term reromanizare is not adequate to describe the linguistic process which has enriched the Romanian vocabulary with new words of Latin or Romance origin since the early 19th century. Ioana Moldovanu-Cenușă emphasizes the differences between the "Roman Westernization", which took place in Moldavia and Wallachia under the influences of the Age of Enlightenment, and the "re-latinization" carried out by the representatives of the Transylvanian School and of the "Latinist current". Historian Ioan-Aurel Pop points out that the lack of precision of the terms may lead to confusion, because the Latin character of the Romanian language was already noticed in the 15th century, placing it in the group of Romance languages.

== Development ==
=== Transylvanian School and Latinist current ===
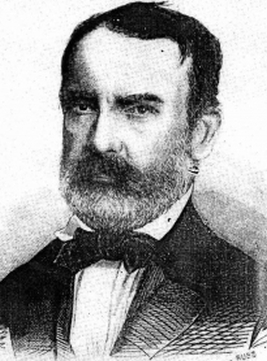
August Treboniu Laurian, the leader of the Latinist current in the 1870s

Educated Romanians started to regard Latin and Italian as linguistic models already in the 17th century. For instance, the loanword popor (from popolo, the Italian word for people) was borrowed in this century and added to the synonymous neam and norod (Hungarian and Slavic loanwords, respectively), both still in use. Scholars of the Transylvanian School were the first to make concerted efforts to eliminate certain non-Romance features of the language in the late 18th century. They were Greek Catholic (or Uniate) intellectuals tutored in Vienna and Rome who were determined to manifest the Latin origin of Romanians. Their activities contributed to the re-orientation of the Romanians' intellectual life towards Western Europe.

These scholars promoted the use of Latin letters in place of Cyrillic script, but the etymologizing (Latinizing) writing system that they developed never won popularity. Their spelling system was primarily designed to demonstrate the Latin roots of the Romanian words, ignoring their contemporary pronunciation. For instance, they proposed that the Romanian words for fountain and land (modern Romanian fântână and țară) should be rendered by fontana and tiera. They decided to replace Slavic loanwords with terms of Latin origin, even trying to get rid of the Romanian word for "and" (și), wrongly attributing a Slavic origin to it. They created portmanteau words, containing both Slavic and Latin roots, like răzbel from the Slavic loanword război and the Latin term bellum (both meaning war).

Scholars of this "Latinist school" (or "Latinist current") held extreme views in their works about the language and history of Romanians, for example in 1853, their leader, August Treboniu Laurian, started his History of the Romanians with the legendary founding of Rome in 753 BC. Laurian and Ioan Massim published the two volumes of their Dictionary of the Romanian Language and a glossary to it in the 1870s. They adopted a writing system which demonstrated the etymology of the words and purged the language of most non-Latin terms. The language that they promoted was artificial, bearing "only a vague resemblance to authentic Romanian". The Academic Society (the future Romanian Academy) had initially commissioned the publication of their dictionary, but their exaggerated attempts to purify the language "provoked laughter and permanently discredited the Latinist school", thus their work was the last publication of the Latinist current.

=== Wallachia and Moldavia ===
Wallachian and Moldavian writers who took a more conventional approach than the Transylvanian scholars were more successful. Re-latinisation reached Wallachia in the early 19th century, when Ion Heliade Rădulescu introduced large numbers of Italian neologisms. Subsequently, literary figures in the Moldavian capital Iași began borrowing from French, at the time the language of high European culture and the language in which most of the bourgeois or aristocratic Romanians completed their higher education, at least until the founding of the first Romanian universities in the second half of the 19th century. In addition to direct borrowings from Romance languages, loan translations also appeared, although some of them could not survive. These were neologisms built as internal lexical formations, created by derivation of the Latin-inherited "root words" from the Romanian groundstock. For instance, the loan translations bărbătesc and femeiesc (from the Romanian words for man and woman respectively) soon vanished to give place to the loanwords masculin and feminin as labels for two grammatical genders. On the other hand, the loanwords futur ("future") and pasat ("past") could not take roots against the newly created synonyms viitor and trecut. Romance doublets—the coexistence of inherited Latin terms and Romance loanwords descending from the same Latin root—became characteristic elements of Romanian vocabulary during this period. For example, the inherited words for tomb (mormânt) and feeling (simțământ) co-exist with the Romance loanwords monument ("monument") and sentiment ("sentiment").

The spread of prefixes borrowed from other Romance languages and Latin also began in the 19th century. Certain prefixes were first directly inherited from Latin, but later their Latin root was also borrowed, thus "etymological doublets" appeared in Romanian. For instance, the prefix cu- descends from Latin con-, and the prefix stră- from extra-, but the original Latin prefixes are now widely used.

The Roman script was introduced gradually between 1830 and 1860. Initially a transitional writing system was introduced which retained certain Cyrillic letters for specific Romanian sounds. For instance, the Romanian mid central vowel (ə) was represented by the Cyrillic letter ⟨Ъ⟩, and the voiceless palato-alveolar fricative (ʃ) by the letter ⟨ш⟩. A pure Latin writing system was introduced by law in Wallachia in 1860 and then in 1862 in Moldavia.

== Effects ==
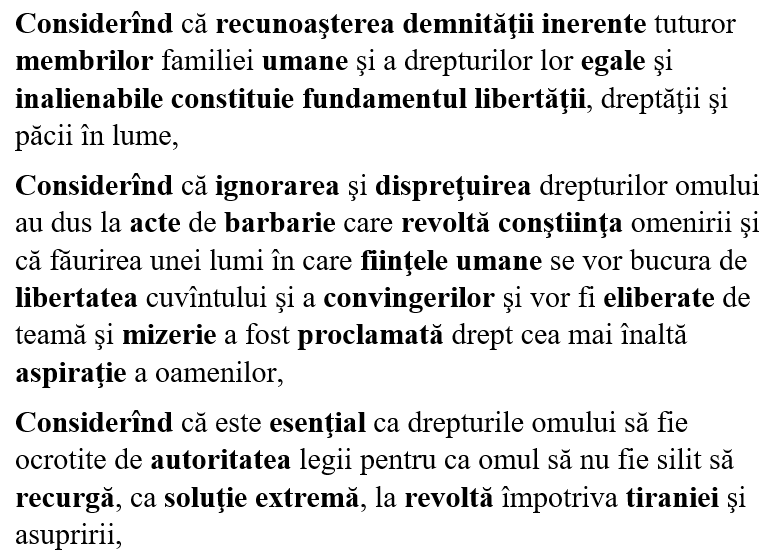
First three paragraphs of the preamble of Universal Declaration of Human Rights in Romanian, with the loanwords from the 18th and 19th century in bold.

The main change brought by the process in comparison to the Old Romanian stage is the adoption of the Latin alphabet (with some peculiarities). It also added a large number of loanwords from French, Italian, and Latin, representing nowadays about 20% of the entire lexis with semantic fields such as Modern World (58%), Law (35%), Emotions and Values (29%), or Clothing and Grooming (27%) being the main areas of distribution in accordance to the changes of the time (post-Ottoman legal system, global development of new technologies and so on). This has also created doublets such as the pair dens from French dense vs des inherited from Latin. The syntax of the language changed from a model imitating the Old Church Slavonic one to a French language inspired type. Re-latinization influenced the grammar of Romanian as well, reanimating the use of the infinitive form of verbs and increasing the use of third conjugation verbs (those ending in –e such as a vinde - "to sell" or a crede - "to believe").

Occasionally, the changes to the language had an opposite effect: the particle da of Slavic origin (most likely Bulgarian and corresponding to English yes, French oui and so on), which appeared in Romanian language texts from the early nineteenth century, generalizes its use across all dialects and standard language replacing the Old Romanian methods of indicating agreement or acceptance through non-specialised words such as așa, adevărat, bine or the repetition of the verb in the question (for example "Scrii pe Wikipedia?" "Scriu!"). This change is due to the modeling of the Romanian syntax after the French one, mainly through translations.

=== Recent trends ===
Linguist Kim Schulte emphasizes that "the large number of words borrowed from other Romance languages over the last two centuries" gives Romanian lexicon "a distinctly Romance appearance". Mallinson likewise concludes that due to the re-latinization process modern Romanian "has attained, if not necessarily retained, a high level of Romance vocabulary, though raw lexical statistics fail to give an adequate picture of precisely how much a Romance language it really is". He argues that some syntactic features also demonstrate how Romanian is "gradually returning to the Romance fold". The revival of the true infinitive and the gradual disappearance of use of reflexive verbs in impersonal passive situations are attributed by scholars to the influence of Western Romance languages. Romanian has a tendency to replace the -uri ending of plural of neuter (or rather ambigeneric) nouns with -e especially in written language. Words ending with -e most probably enjoy a higher status, because many of them were borrowed from Romance languages, according to Mallinson. Linguist Mioara Avram highlights the recent influence of English which, although a Germanic language, has a significant Romance component of French origin, as well as numerous Latin etymological lexemes, and argues that contemporary English loans continue indirectly the old re-latinization or re-romanization process of the Romanian language.

== See also ==
- Modern Romanian

== Sources ==
- Aldea, Maria (2017). "Reromanizarea limbii române în viziunea lui Sextil Pușcariu" (PDF). Caietele Sextil Pușcariu. III: 15–20. Archived from the original (PDF) on 2019-06-29.
- Bahner, Werner (2015). "Zur Romanität des Rumänischen in der Geschichte der romanischen Philologie vom 15. bis zur Mitte des 18. Jahrhunderts". Romanistisches Jahrbuch). 8 (1): 75–94. doi:10.1515/roja-1957-0108. S2CID 184831935.
- Boia, Lucian (2001). Romania: Borderland of Europe. Reaktion Books. pp. 84–85. ISBN 9781861891037.
- Boia, Lucian (2001). History and Myth in Romanian Consciousness. Central European University Press. ISBN 978-963-9116-97-9.
- Bossong, Georg (2016). Ledgeway, Adam; Maiden, Martin (eds.). The Oxford Guide of Romance Languages. Oxford: Oxford University Press. p. 64. ISBN 978-0-19-967710-8.
- Buzatu, Mihaela (2007). "Teoria contactelor dintre limbi; cu privire specială asupra contactelor între română şi engleză" (PDF). Philologica Jassyensia (2): 155–189.
- Chivu, Gheorghe (2016). "La modernisation latino-romane du lexique roumain. Le modèle interne". Diversité et Identité Culturelle en Europe. 2 (XIII): 7–18.
- Diez, Friedrich (1836). Grammar of the Romance Languages. Bonn: Eduard Weber. p. 3.
- Dimitriu, Corneliu (1973). Romanitatea vocabularului unor texte vechi româneşti : Studiu statistic. Iaşi: Junimea. p. 83.
- Gerhard, Ernst (1998). Kontrastive Untersuchungen I. Rumänisch und andere Sprachen, in Holtus Günter, Metzeltin Michael, Schmitt Christian, Lexikon der romanistischen Linguistik. Tübingen: Max Niemeyer Verlag. pp. 757–778. ISBN 3-484-50237-1.
- Gess, Randall Scott; Arteaga, Deborah (2006). Historical Romance Linguistics: Retrospective and Perspectives. John Benjamins Publishing. pp. 258–259. ISBN 9789027247889.
- Grant, Anthony P. (2000). "Reviewed Work: Relexification in Creole and Non-Creole Languages, with Special Attention to Haitian Creole, Modern Hebrew, Romani, and Rumanian by Julia Horvath, Paul Wexler". Anthropological Linguistics. 42 (4): 589–592. JSTOR 30028575.
- Harris, Martin (1988). Harris, Martin; Vincent, Nigel (eds.). The Romance Languages. Oxford University Press. pp. 1–23. ISBN 978-0-19-520829-0.
- Haarmann, Harald (1976). Niederehe, Hans-Joseph; Haarmann, John Benjamin (eds.). In Memoriam Friedrich Diez. Amsterdam: John Benjamin. p. 238. ISBN 90-272-0891-3.
- Schippel, Larisa (2011). Kittel, Harald (ed.). International Encyclopedia of Translation Studies. Berlin, Boston: Walter de Gruyter. p. 2115. ISBN 9783110226621.
- Macrea, Dimitrie (1982). Probleme ale structurii și evoluției limbii române. Editura Științifică și Enciclopedică. p. 271.
- Maiden, Martin (2010). "Italian's long-lost sister: the Romanian language and why Italianists should know about it". The Italianist. 30 (sup2): 29–43. doi:10.1080/02614340.2010.11917476. S2CID 149202032.
- Mallinson, Graham (1988). "Rumanian". In Harris, Martin; Vincent, Nigel (eds.). The Romance Languages. Oxford University Press. pp. 391–419. ISBN 978-0-19-520829-0.
- Mallinson, Graham; Bărbulescu, Oana Uță (1990). "Romanian". In Comrie, Bernard (ed.). The World's Major Languages. Oxford University Press. pp. 303–321. ISBN 0-19-506511-5.
- Millar, Robert McColl; Trask, Larry (2015). Trask's Historical Linguistics. Routledge. ISBN 978-0-415-70657-5.
- Moldovanu-Cenușă, Ioana (2013). "Influenţa franceză în cadrul arhitecturii limbii române. Teoria "relatinizării" sau a "reromanizării"" (PDF). Philologica Jassyensia. IX (1): 183–94. Archived from the original (PDF) on 2018-04-10.
- Nandriș, Grigore (December 1951). "The development and structure of Rumanian". The Slavonic and East European Review. 30 (74): 7–33.
- Petrucci, Peter R. (1999). Slavic Features in the History of Rumanian. Lincom Europa. ISBN 38-9586-599-0.
- Pop, Ioan-Aurel (2015). "The Significance of Medieval Testimonies about the Romanian Language". Caietele Sextil Puşcariu. II. Institutul de Lingvistică şi Istorie Literară "Sextil Puşcariu", Cluj-Napoca: 33–41.
- Posner, Rebecca (1996). The Romance Languages. Cambridge University Press. ISBN 978-0-52-128139-3.
- Rainer, Franz (2016). "Derivational morphology". In Ledgeway, Adam; Maiden, Martin (eds.). The Oxford Guide to the Romance Languages. Oxford University Press. pp. 513–523. ISBN 978-0-19-967710-8.
- Sala, Marius (2005). From Latin to Romanian: The Historical Development of Romanian in a Comparative Romance Context. University, Mississippi. ISBN 1-889441-12-0.
- Sala, Marius (2010). "Romanian". Revue Belge de Philologie et d'Histoire. 88 (88–3): 841–872. doi:10.3406/rbph.2010.7806.
- Schulte, Kim (2009). "Loanwords in Romanian". In Haspelmath, Martin; Tadmor, Uri (eds.). Loanwords in the World's Languages: A Comparative Handbook. De Gruyter Mouton. pp. 230–259. ISBN 978-3-11-021843-5.
- Wexler, Paul (1997). "The case for the relexification hypothesis in Rumanian". In Horváth, Júlia; Wexler, Paul (eds.). Relexification in Creole and Non-Creole Languages: With special attention to Haitian Creole, Modern Hebrew, Romani, and Rumanian. Harrassowith Verlag. pp. 162–188. ISBN 978-3-447-03954-3.
- Zwannenburg, Wiecher (2006). "German Influence in Romanian". In Gess, Randall S.; Arteaga, Deborah (eds.). Historical Romance Linguistics: Retrospective and Perspectives. John Benjamins Publishing Company. pp. 253–268. ISBN 90-272-4788-9.
