= Dacia Literară =

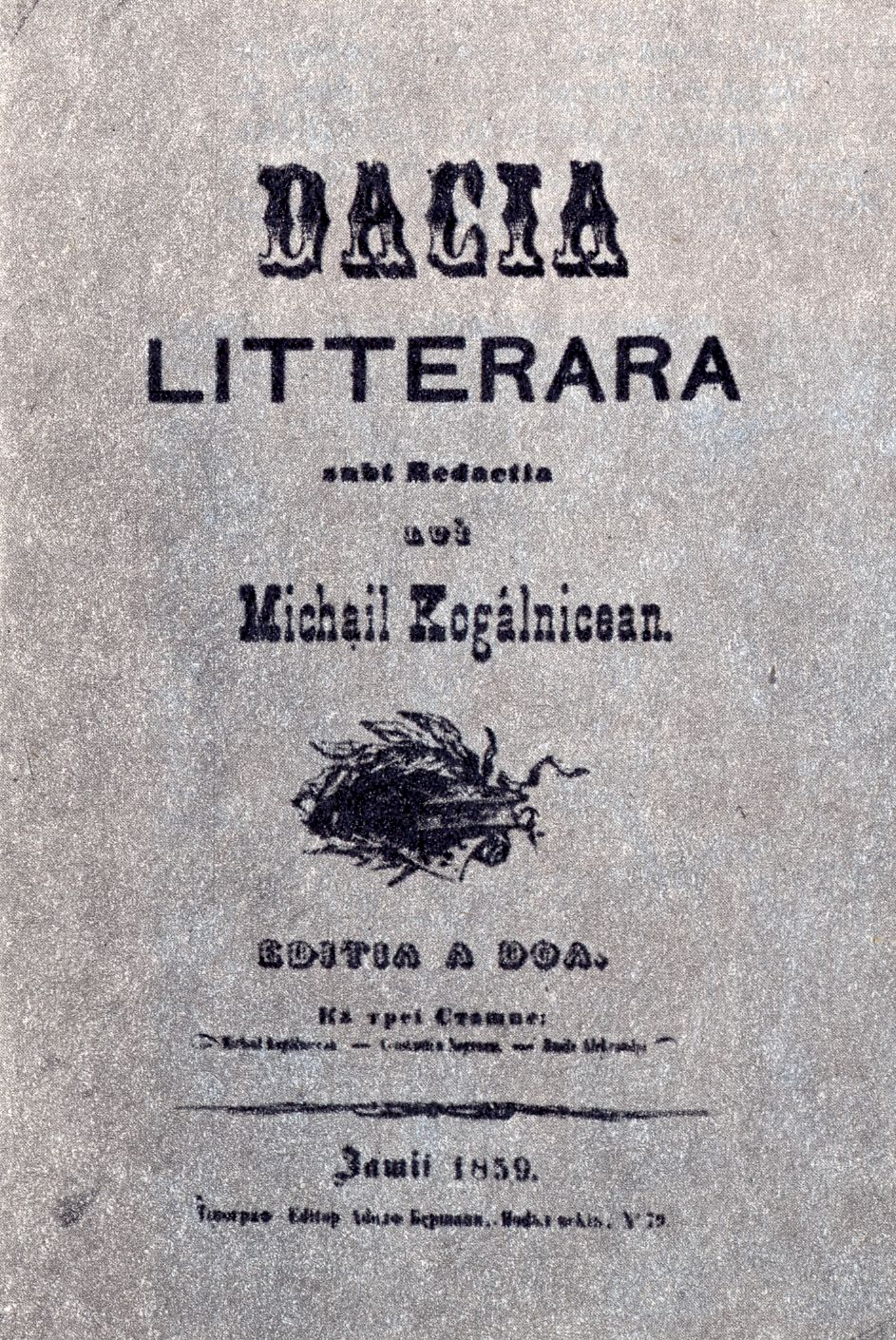
- Dacia Literară, second edition
- Categories: History magazine
- Frequency: Monthly
- First issue: January 1840
- Final issue: June 1840
- Country: Moldavia; Romania
- Language: Romanian

Dacia Literară was the first Romanian literary and political journal which was published between January and June 1840.

== History ==
Founded by Mihail Kogălniceanu and printed in Iaşi, Dacia Literară was a Romantic nationalist and liberal magazine, engendering a literary society. The first edition was short-lived—lasting only from January to June 1840.
