= Elementa linguae daco-romanae sive valachicae =

First Romanian grammar book

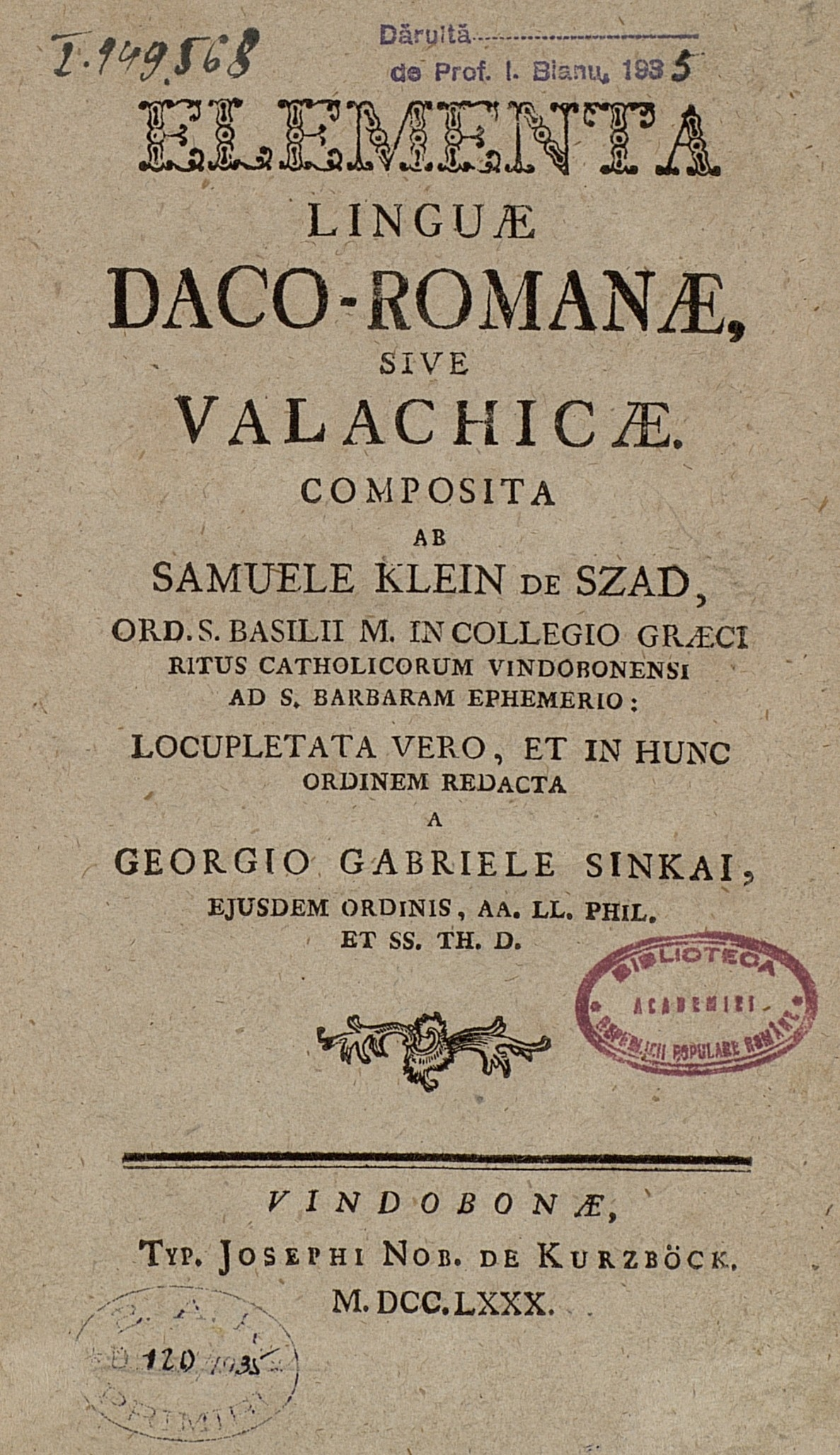
Elementa linguae daco-romanae sive valachicae, Vienna, 1780

Elementa linguae daco-romanae sive valachicae ("Elements of the Daco-Roman or Vlach/Wallachian language") is a Romanian grammar book written by Samuil Micu-Klein and revised by Gheorghe Șincai in 1780 at the Saint Barbara College in Vienna. It was printed by Joseph Typography, owned by the nobleman of Kurzböck, in the same year. The book, and subsequently the year, are considered the starting point of the Romanian language's modern form.

== Content ==
The book's introduction is written by Gheorghe Șincai and it is a synthesis of historic and linguistic views held by the Transylvanian School.

The main body of the book is divided into four parts: De ortographia, De etymologhia, De syntaxi, and an Appendix containing a chapter about "the formation of Daco-Roman words from the Latin ones".

In De ortographia the authors describe the changes from Latin phonemes to Romanian ones. Lacking the corresponding letters to mark the sounds for /ə/, /ɨ/, /c/, /ɡ/, /t͡s/, /ʃ/, /t͡ʃ/, /d͡ʒ/ Samuil Micu-Klein appealed to similarities to other language like German, Italian, or Hungarian, opting for a less phonemic orthography than the one used in the current writing system, with rules derived from Latin orthography to designate the new sounds of the language. For example á or aa would stand for standard /a/ sound, while a without an accent would represent the schwa sound, nowadays written as ă.

Failing to demonstrate that the Romanian language is the direct descendant of Classical Latin, as initially intended, the authors considered the influence of foreign languages, mainly Slavic languages and in particular Old Church Slavonic which was the official language of the Orthodox Church among Romanians, as the source of Romanian/Latin language "corruption". Nevertheless, while taking into consideration as etymons only attested Latin words, they discovered some of the main phonetic changes that took place in the development from Latin to Romanian.

A study done on the vocabulary from the last part of the Appendix showed a total of 486 words, 334 of which being of Latin origin, 117 loanwords from contact languages (representing 24,07% of the total), 18 loanwords from Modern Latin, 4 words formed internally (fărdezeu, maimari, necăsătorință, zioară) and another 4 of unknown origin (cioareci, pânză, prunc, sein).
