= Gheorghe Șincai =

Romanian writer (1754–1816)

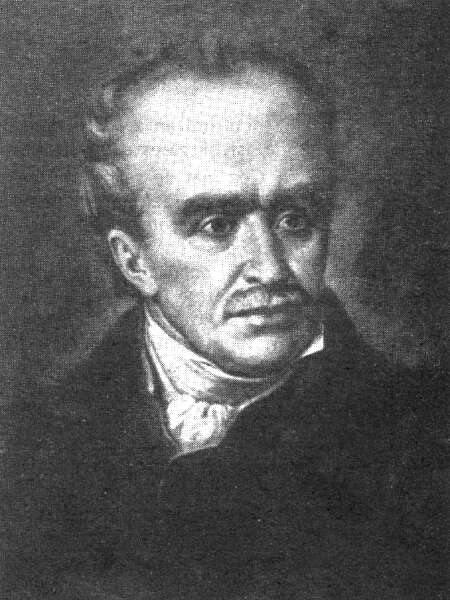
- Gheorghe Șincai
- Born: 13 March 1754; Râciul de Câmpie, Principality of Transylvania, Habsburg Empire
- Died: November 2, 1806; Svinica, Kingdom of Hungary, Habsburg Empire
- Occupations: Theologian; historian; philologist
- Era: Enlightenment
- Movement: Transylvanian School
- Writing career
- Language: Romanian
- Notable work: Elementa linguae daco-romanae sive valachicae

Gheorghe Șincai (Romanian pronunciation: [ˈɡe̯orɡe ˈʃiŋkaj]; 13 March [O.S. 28 February] 1754 – November 2, 1816) was a historian, philologist, translator, poet, and representative of the Enlightenment-influenced Transylvanian School.

As the director of Greek Catholic education in Transylvania he brought a fundamental contribution to the process of promoting culture in rural environments. He revised before publishing Samuil Micu's first grammar of the Romanian language: Elementa linguae daco-romanae sive valachicae (The elements of the Daco-Roman or Vlach/Wallachian language) (Vienna, 1780), in which they demonstrated the Latin origins of the Romanian language.

== Biography ==
He was born in Mezősámsond (now Șincai, Mureș County), though some sources put his birthplace at the nearby Râciu de Câmpie village. He studied at Târgu-Mureș, Cluj, Bistrița, Blaj, Vienna, and Rome (in the last two cities together with Samuil Micu, nephew of Bishop Inocențiu Micu-Klein).

He turned out to be a polyglot, thoroughly mastering Greek, Latin, Hungarian, German, Italian and French. His knowledge and culture allowed him to occupy the function of librarian of the Congregation for the Evangelization of Peoples in Rome, having permission to research any type of document. In the Papal States, and later in Hungary and in Vienna (the capital of the Habsburg domains), he carried out research work in various libraries, copying and transcribing exactly any reference to the history of the Romanians.

Șincai assiduously worked to educate commoners, dedicating himself to a career in teaching, and contributing to the establishment of an impressive number of Greek-Catholic parochial schools (in all, over 300). In 1784 he was named general director of Romanian Uniate schools in all of Transylvania.

He translated and expanded the following basic textbooks for educational purposes: Abecedarul (The Book of ABCs), Gramatica (Grammar), Aritmetica (Arithmetic), and Catehismul (The Catechism), adapting or creating the terminology necessary for pupils to understand these. He proved himself to be a remarkable translator, rendering the Bible into Romanian (in 1789, under the name of The Blaj Bible).

In 1794 Șincai came into direct conflict with Bishop Ioan Bob; he was thrown into the harsh Aiud Prison, being followed and persecuted by the Habsburg authorities after his release in 1796.

In 1811 Șincai published a work of history, written in the form of annals and amply titled: Hronica românilor și a mai multor neamuri în cât au fost ele amestecate cu românii, cât lucrurile, întâmplările și faptele unora față de ale altora nu se pot scrie pre înțeles, din mai multe mii de autori, în cursul a treizeci și patru de ani culese (The chronicle of the Romanians and of other peoples insofar as they were mixed with the Romanians, as the things, events and facts of the one regarding the other cannot be written as if everyone understands them, from several thousand authors, gathered over the course of thirty-four years).

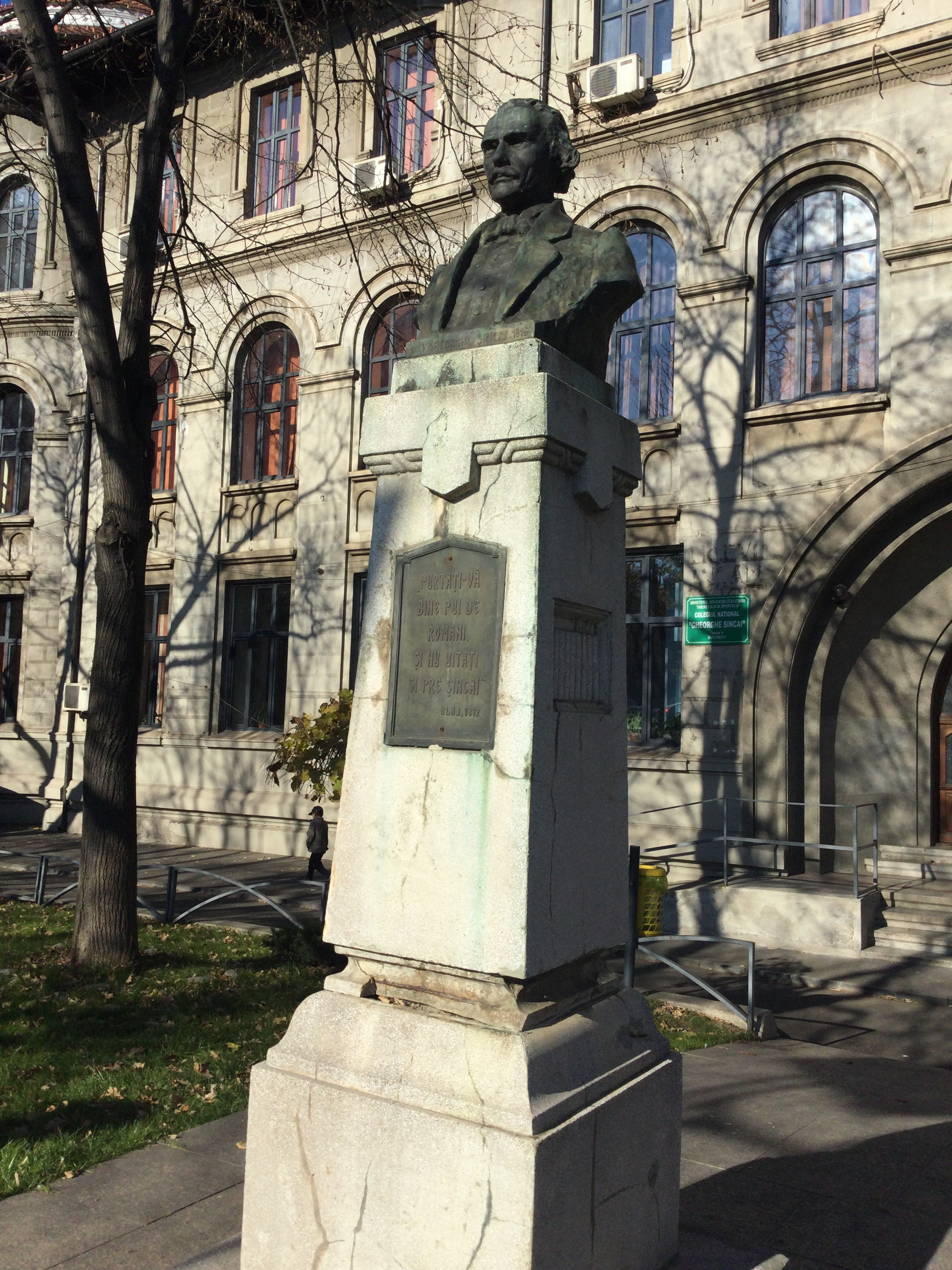
Bust of Șincai in front of the Gheorghe Șincai National College in Bucharest

Șincai died at Svinica, near Kassa (today Košice in present-day Slovakia).

There are two Romanian national colleges named after him: one in Bucharest and one in Baia Mare.

== Bibliography ==
- Dionis Popa, Gheorghe Șincai, Blaj, 1944

== Externals links (in Romanian) ==
- Contribuții la biografia lui Gheorghe Șincai, articol publicat de Lucia Protopopescu în revista Limbă și literatură
- Vieti'a operele şi ideele lui Georgiu Sincai din Sinc'a : cu XIV annesse si unu fac-simile, 1869
- Colecții digitalizate disponibile gratuit în Biblioteca Digitală a BCU Iași
- Chronica românilor şi a mai multor némuri : vol.1 : Anii 84-1439, 1886, Ediţiunea a 2-a
- Chronica românilor şi a mai multor némuri : vol.2 : Anii 1440-1614, 1886, Ediţiunea a 2-a
- Chronica românilor şi a mai multor némuri : vol.3 : Anii 1614-1739, 1886, Ediţiunea a 2-a
