= Svinica, Košice-okolie District =

Municipality of Slovakia

Svinica Petőszinye
- Municipality
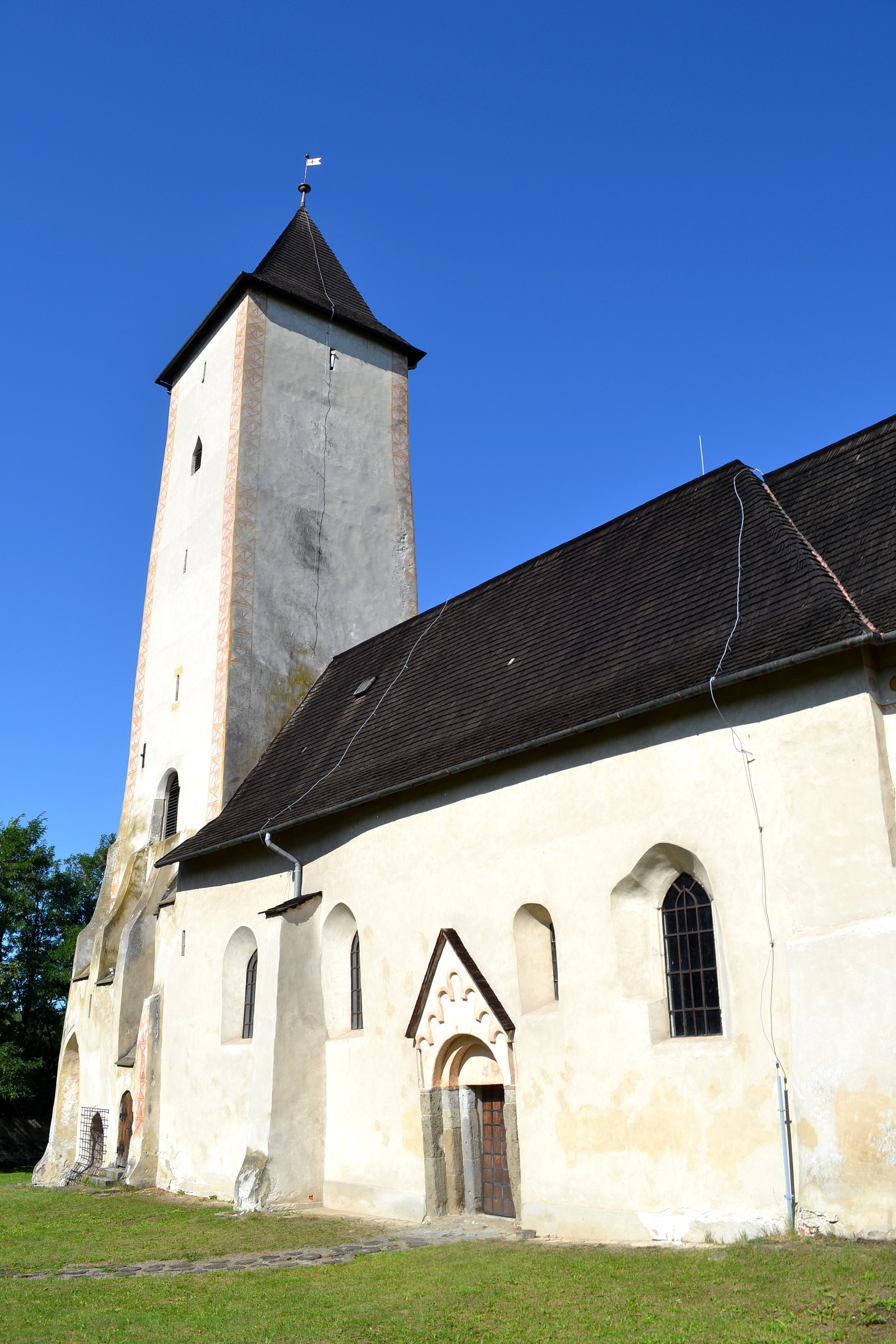

- Flag

- Location of Svinica in the Košice Region Location of Svinica in Slovakia
- Coordinates: 48.73°N 21.47°E
- Country: Slovakia
- Region: Košice Region
- District: Košice-okolie District
- First mentioned: 1276

Area
  - Total: 27.12 km^{2} (10.47 sq mi)
- Elevation: 252 m (827 ft)

Population (2025)
  - Total: 1,004
- Time zone: UTC+1 (CET)
  - Summer (DST): UTC+2 (CEST)
- Postal code: 444 5
- Area code: +421 55
- Vehicle registration plate (until 2022): KS
- Website: obecsvinica.sk

Svinica (German: Swinitz; Hungarian: Petőszinye) is a village and municipality in Košice-okolie District in the Kosice Region of eastern Slovakia.

== Etymology ==
Svinia or Svinná, later Svinica, derived from sviňa (Proto-Slavic svinьja) - a pig. 1276 Zyna, 1369 Scwynycza, 1427 Szyna, 1430 Zwynne.

== History ==
In historical records the village was first mentioned in 1276 as belonging to paladin Omodey, lords of Füzér Castle. In the 13th century it belonged to Perényi family and it began an important market place. In 1772 it passed to Szerencsy falily.

== Geography ==
The municipality lies at an altitude of 252 metres (827 ft) and covers an area of 27.12 km^{2} (10.47 sq mi) (2025).

== Population ==
Population statistic (10 years)
| Year | 1995 | 2005 | 2015 | 2025 |
|---|---|---|---|---|
| Count | 643 | 824 | 864 | 1004 |
| Difference | | +28.14% | +4.85% | +16.20% |

Population statistic
| Year | 2024 | 2025 |
|---|---|---|
| Count | 1010 | 1004 |
| Difference | | −0.59% |

It has a population of 1004 people (31 December 2025).

=== Ethnicity ===
Census 2021 (1+ %)
| Ethnicity | Number | Fraction |
|---|---|---|
| Slovak | 917 | 92.71% |
| Not found out | 51 | 5.15% |
| Romani | 33 | 3.33% |
| Hungarian | 10 | 1.01% |
| Total | 989 | |

In year 2021 was 989 people by ethnicity 917 as Slovak, 51 as Not found out, 33 as Romani, 10 as Hungarian, 7 as Rusyn, 5 as Czech, 4 as Other, 1 as Russian and 1 as Polish.

Note on population: The difference values of population numbers in the table "Population statistic" and in the sections "Ethnicity" & "Religion" is caused by the use of various statistical methods.

=== Religion ===
Census 2021 (1+ %)
| Religion | Number | Fraction |
|---|---|---|
| Roman Catholic Church | 532 | 53.79% |
| None | 123 | 12.44% |
| Greek Catholic Church | 101 | 10.21% |
| Calvinist Church | 82 | 8.29% |
| Not found out | 70 | 7.08% |
| Evangelical Church | 52 | 5.26% |
| Christian Congregations in Slovakia | 12 | 1.21% |
| Total | 989 | |

In year 2021 was 989 people by religion 532 from Roman Catholic Church, 123 from None, 101 from Greek Catholic Church, 82 from Calvinist Church, 70 from Not found out, 52 from Evangelical Church, 12 from Christian Congregations in Slovakia, 7 from Jehovah's Witnesses, 4 from Ad hoc movements, 3 from Eastern Orthodox Church, 1 from Old Catholic Church, 1 from Paganism and natural spirituality and 1 from Islam.
