= Timotei Cipariu =

Romanian cleric and academic

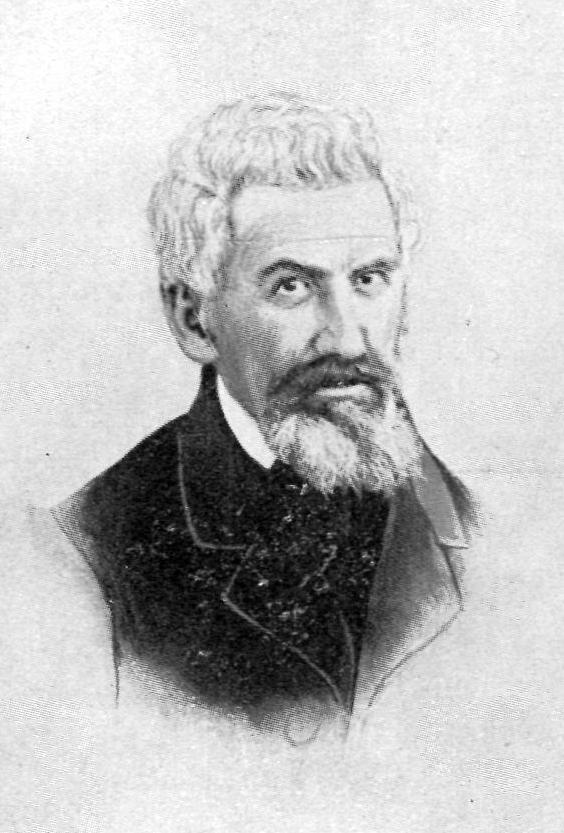
Timotei Cipariu

Timotei Cipariu (February 21, 1805 – September 3, 1887) was a Transylvanian Romanian scholar, Greek-Catholic cleric (canonical and chapter prefect), Pașoptist revolutionary, politician in Transylvania, founding member of the Romanian Academy, first vice-president, then president of the Transylvanian Association for Romanian Literature and the Culture of the Romanian People, linguist, historian, theologian, pedagogue, orientalist, and polyglot (he knew about 15 languages).

== Life ==
Cipariu was born in Pănade, plasa Hususău, Târnava-Mică County. He completed his school studies in Blaj, the gymnasium between (1816 – 1820), followed by the philosophical (1820 – 1822) and the theological (1822 – 1825). Between 1825 and 1827 he was a teacher at the Gymnasium in Blaj. In 1828 he became a professor of philosophy, and between 1834 and 1842 a professor of Dogmatics, then of Biblical Studies at the Seminary. Between 1854 and 1875 he was director of the Gymnasium and inspector of schools in the city, and between 1833 and 1866 he was director of the Diocesan Printing Office. In 1827 he became a priest, from 1842 he was a canon, and later the chapter prefect of the Archdiocese of Alba Iulia and Făgăraș, based in Blaj where he lived for most of his life.

Representative personality of Romanian culture, called "the father of Romanian philology", he was conversant in many languages (Greek, Latin, Hebrew, Arabic, Syriac, Turkish, Persian, Spanish, Italian, German, English, Hungarian). Timotei Cipariu was the owner of one of the richest private libraries in Transylvania, precious also by its rarities. These books were especially procured for him by his friend from Bucharest, the bookseller Iosif Romanov, and by his company's representatives in Constantinople and Cairo. In October 1948, the communist regime imposed, according to the order from Moscow, the outlawing of the Romanian Greek Catholic Church and the assimilation of its believers into the Orthodox Church, confiscating the Cipariu Library (bequeathed to the Bishopric of Blaj) and illegally placing it in the Library's inventory Cluj Branch of the Romanian Academy. Timotei Cipariu was one of the pioneers of Romanian journalism in Transylvania through the periodicals founded and managed by him:

- The organ of light (1847, became the National Organ in 1848), the first Romanian newspaper with Latin letters,
- The Teacher of the People (1848),
- Archive for philology and history between 1867 and 1870 and in 1872 – the first Romanian magazine of philology.

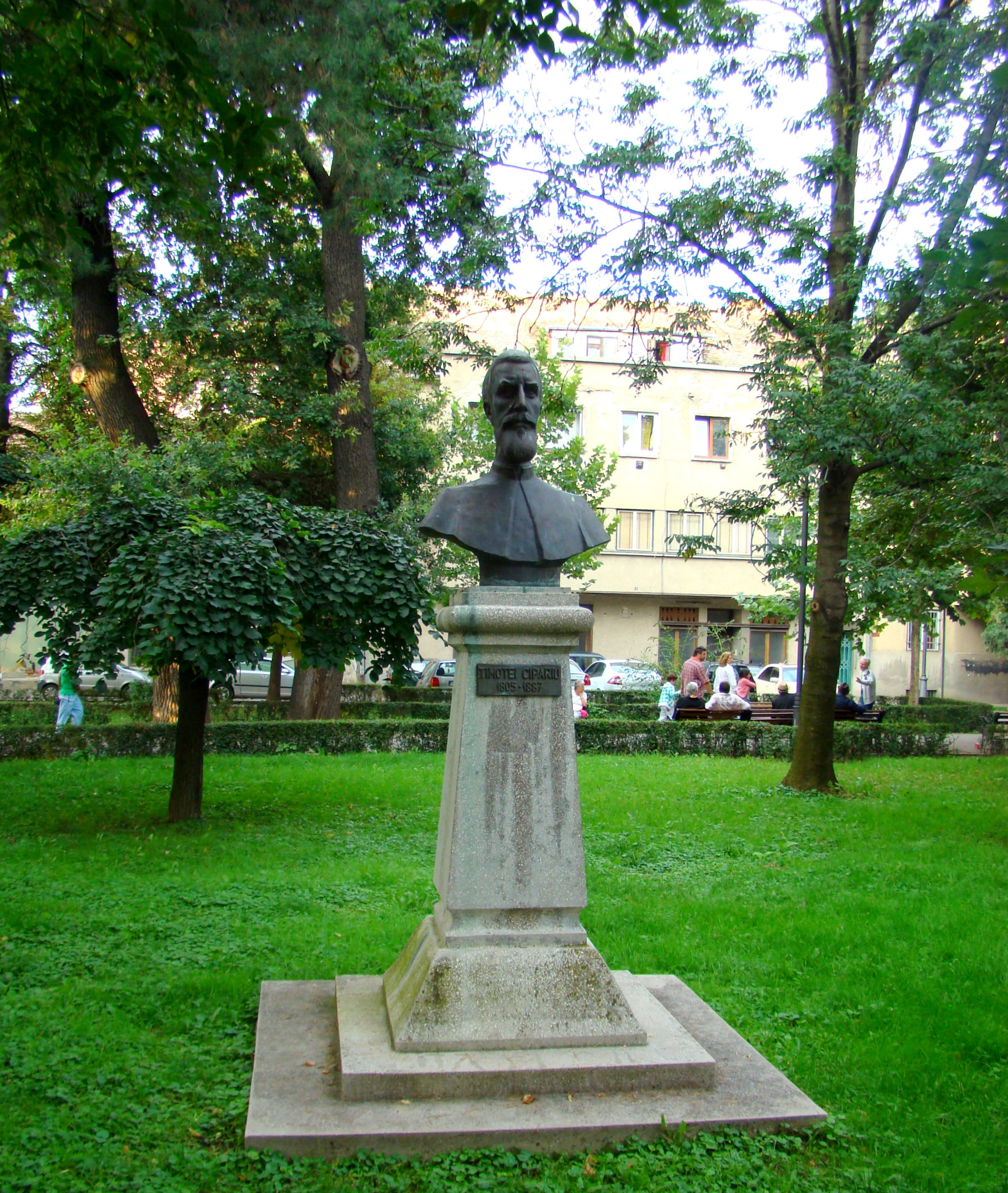
Bust of Cipariu in Sibiu

He collaborated at Paper for the Mind, Heart and Literature in Brașov with studies, essays, poems and translations. He was a founding member and first vice-president (1861–1866), then president (1877–1887) of the ASTRA society. He was a member of the Romanian Literary Society (1866), the future Romanian Academy, being later elected its vice-president. He was a member of the German Orientalist Society.

He published a very long series of studies on the Romanian language and its grammar, being considered one of the founders of Romanian philology and linguistics. Through his studies he sought to prove the historical rights of the Romanian people and their Romanian origin. Influenced by the Transylvanian School, he was one of the followers of Latinism and etymological spelling, for which he proposed the predilection of words of Latin origin and the avoidance of words of non-Latin origin. In the political realm, he was among the activists for the rights of the Romanian people in Transylvania, being one of the ten secretaries of the Blaj National Assembly in 1848. Member of the Delegation sent to the Imperial Court in Vienna to present the Romanian claims, member of the Romanian National Committee in Sibiu, and in 1863–1864 member of the Sibiu Diet.

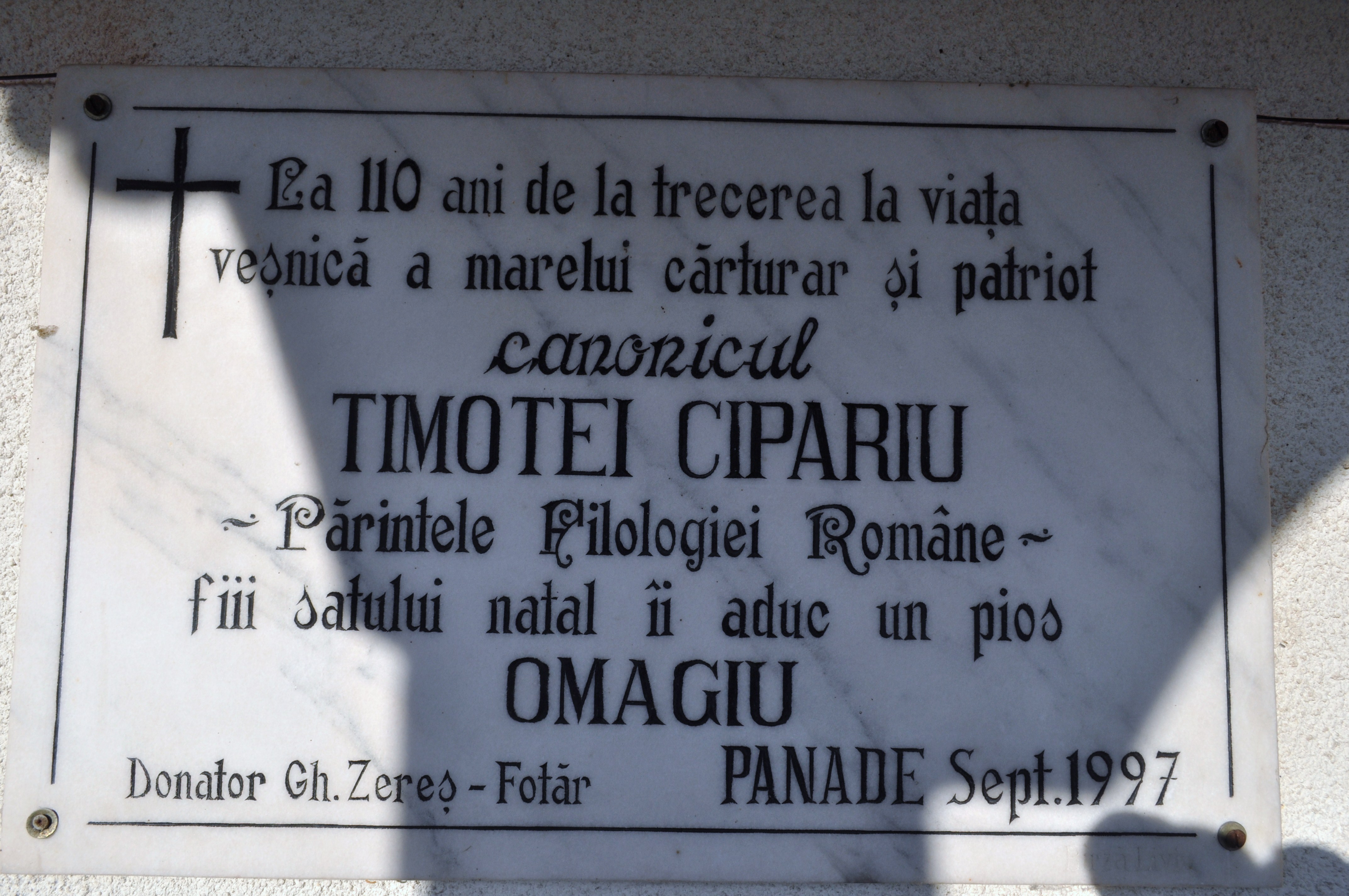
Plaque in memory of Cipariu, at the Orthodox church in Pănade

He died on September 3, 1887 in Blaj, and was buried in the city's cemetery near the Church of the Greeks. The funeral speeches were delivered on the day of the funeral (September 5, 1887), by the gymnasium teacher Ioan Germanu, and by the canonical Father Dr. Ioan Rațiu.

== Works ==
- Eclogue, Blaj, 1833;
- Pastoral drama, Blaj, 1860;
- Elements of the Romanian language according to dialects and old monuments, Blaj, 1854.
- The Holy or Biblical History of the Old and New Testaments, Blaj, 1855 (2nd ed., 1859);
- Scientia Sântei Scripture, Blaj, 1854, he reprinted the Orologier and the Liturgier in Latin letters.
- Acts and Latin and Romanian fragments for the history of the Romanian Church, especially united, Blaj, 1855.
- Compendium of Romanian grammar, Blaj, 1855 (5th ed., Sibiu, 1876, 7th ed., Blaj, 1897);
- Chrestomatie or Literary Analects from older and newer Romanian printed and manuscript books, starting from the century XVI to XIX, with literary note, Blaj, 1858.
- Elements of poetics, metrics and versification, Blaj, 1860.
- Speech at the inauguration of the Association, Blaj, 1862.
- The Principle of Language and Scripture, ed. I, Blaj, 1856; ed. II, Blaj, 1866.
- Grammar of the Romanian language, vol. 1. Analytica, Blaj, 1869, XIV+388 p.; volume II. Sintactica, Sibiu, 1877.
- About the Romanian language. Supplement to Syntactics, Blaj, 1877.

=== Translations ===
- Grammar of the Latin language, 2 vols., after M. Schinagl, Blaj, 1857–1860 (2nd ed., 1865–1869).
- WT Krug, Elements of philosophy, 2 vols., Blaj, 1861–1863.
- Good manners between people, Blaj, 1855; ed. II, Sibiu, 1863.

=== Posthumous ===
- Journey in Muntenia, in volume Prietenii istoriei literare I, Bucharest, 1931 (published by Al. Lupeanu Melin);
- Journal, ed. edited and foreword by Maria Protase, Cluj, 1972.
- Poems, ed. edited and foreword by N. Albu, Cluj, 1976.
- Speeches, ed. edited, anthology and glossary by Ștefan Manciulea and Ion Buzași, Cluj-Napoca, 1994.
- Works. Vol. I, edition edited by Carmen Gabriela Pamfil, introduction by Gavril Istrate, Bucharest, 1987; vol. II, introduction by Mioara Avram, Bucharest, 1992.
- Literary pages, edited edition and afterword by Ion Buzași, Bucharest, 1999.
- Epistolary 1836-1877, foreword by Eugen Simion, neat text, introductory study and notes by Ioan Chindriș, Bucharest, Romanian Academy Publishing House, 2005.
- Poems and religious writings, edited by Ion Buzași, Târgu Lăpuș, Galaxia Gutenberg, 2008.
