= Petru Maior =

Romanian writer

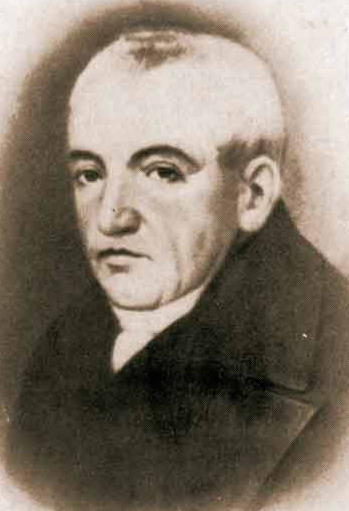
- Petru Maior
- Born: 1756; Marosvásárhely, Principality of Transylvania, Habsburg Empire
- Died: 14 February 1821 (aged 64–65); Buda, Kingdom of Hungary, Habsburg Empire
- Occupations: Theologian; historian; philologist
- Era: Enlightenment
- Movement: Transylvanian School
- Writing career
- Language: Romanian
- Notable work: Istoria pentru începutul românilor în Dachia (History of the beginnings of the Romanians in Dacia)

Petru Maior (Romanian pronunciation: [ˈpetru ˈmajor]; 1756 in Marosvásárhely (now Târgu Mureș, Romania) – 14 February 1821 in Buda) was a Romanian writer who is considered one of the most influential personalities of the Age of Enlightenment in Transylvania (the Transylvanian School). Maior was a member of the Greek-Catholic clergy, a historian, philosopher, and linguist.

== Biography ==
His family originated from Diciosânmartin. His father, George Maior, was a protopop in Marosvásárhely, and then in Căpușul de Câmpie. He studied at Seminary of Blaj and became a monk, taking the name Paul, at 14 years. Along with Samuil Micu-Klein and Ioachim Pop he received a scholarship at Pontificio Collegio Urbano de Propaganda Fide where he studied philosophy and theology for five years, between 1774 and 1779. He completed his education in Vienna, learning about the canon law of the Catholic Church. Petru Maior took a stand and responded, in 1812, by writing the Istoria pentru începutul românilor în Dachia against all those who questioned the origin, character, and the becoming of his people.

He was a prolific writer, who published everything he wrote during his lifetime except for two theological works: "Procanon" (1783) and "Protopopadichia" (The power of the archpriests) (1795).

The Lexicon Budense, a book published in 1825, included two texts by Petru Maior, Orthographia romana sive latino-valachica una cum clavi and Dialogu pentru inceputul linbei române, in which he introduced the letters ș for /ʃ/ and ț for /ts/, which have since been in use in the Romanian alphabet.

Among the ideas vehiculated by him was that before the Council of Florence Romanians used the Latin alphabet to write and that Romanian language evolved from Vulgar Latin, being, in his words, "a predecessor of the Latin language of the books".

== Selected works ==
- Didahii (1809)
- Propovedanii (1809)
- Prediche (Sermons) (1810–1811)
- Istoria pentru începutul românilor în Dachia (History of the beginnings of the Romanians in Dacia) (1812)
- Istoria Besearicei românilor (History of Romanian Church) (1813)
