= Aaron Florian =

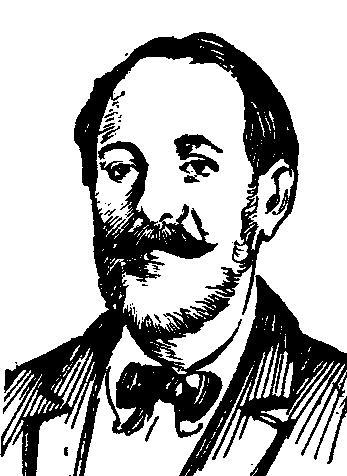
Illustration of Florian (1962)

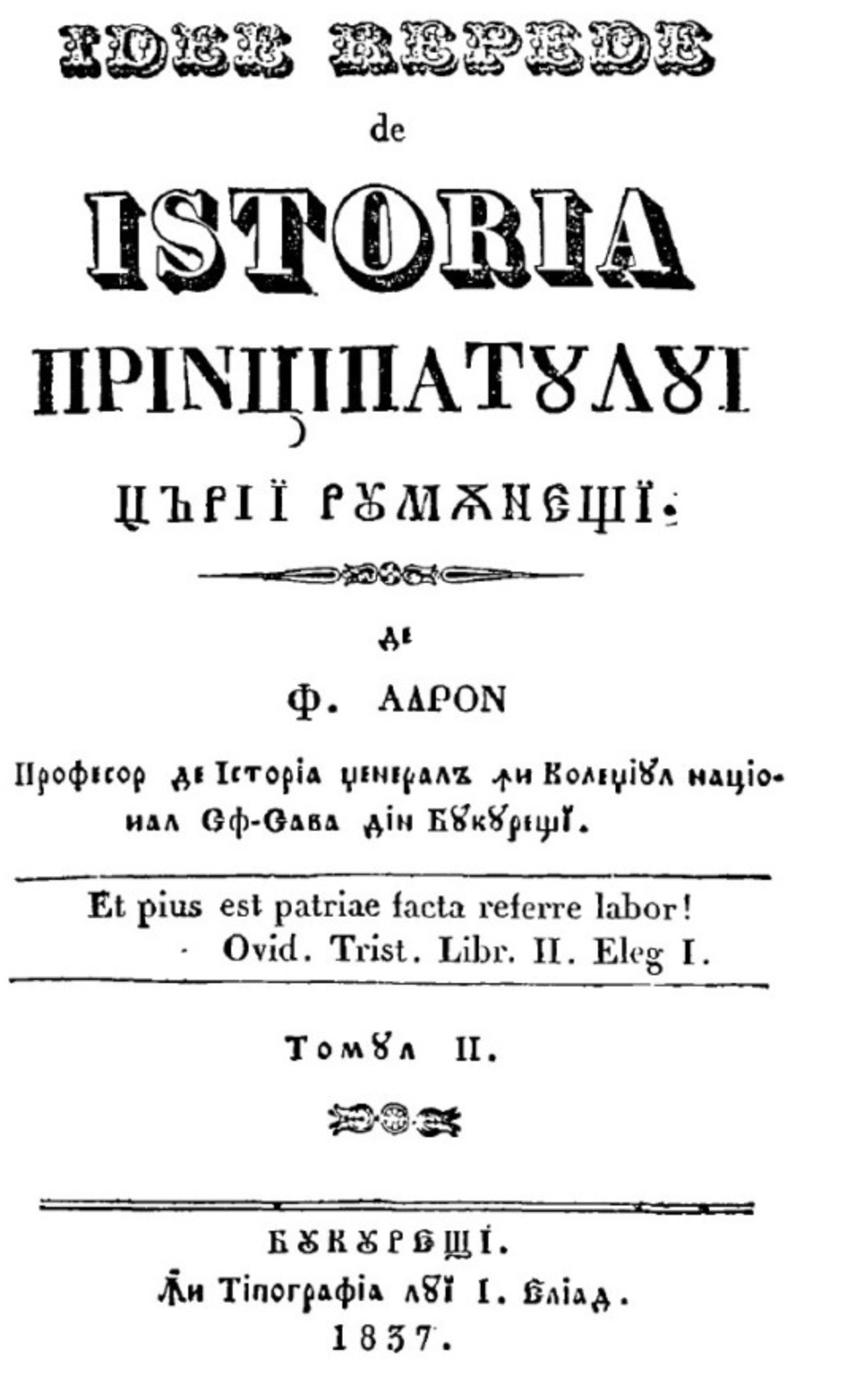
Idee repede de istoria prințipatului Țării Românești (volume II, 1837); the Romanian transitional alphabet is used

Aaron Florian (January 21, 1805–July 12, 1887) was an Imperial Austrian-born Romanian historian, journalist and revolutionary.

== Biography ==
=== Early years and teaching ===
The son of Romanian Orthodox priest Ioan Florian, he was born in Rod, a village located in the Mărginimea Sibiului region which at the time belonged to the Austrian Empire’s Principality of Transylvania and is now in Romania. After attending primary school in Sibiu, he studied at the gymnasium in Blaj. He then enrolled at the Royal University of Pest. In 1826, the Wallachian boyar intellectual Dinicu Golescu invited Florian to teach Latin at the school in Golești, where he remained until 1830. At that point, he transferred to the Craiova Central School.

In 1832, Florian was named teacher of world history at Saint Sava College in Bucharest, the capital of Wallachia. This ushered in the most stable phase of his career, lasting a decade and a half. He became one of the institution’s more prominent faculty members, inspiring his students to cherish their national history. Moreover, Florian published textbooks and took part in committees for bettering the education system. In 1836, he was editor at Ion Heliade Rădulescu’s Muzeul național, while also making consistent contributions to the Brașov-based Foaie pentru minte, inimă și literatură, run by his friend George Bariț. His dispatches from Bucharest, usually unsigned, presented a lucid analysis of the local political scene.

Florian helped popularize the notion of cultural, political and economic unity among Romanians. In 1837, he co-founded an early daily newspaper, România, where these ideas were disseminated. In spite of harsh censorship, it managed to present the situation in all three historic Romanian lands of Wallachia, Moldavia and Transylvania. The fact that it was written in Romanian, as well as its progressive stance, made România the area’s most visible political periodical prior to the 1848 Revolution.

=== 1848 Revolution ===
In his textbooks on history, Florian emphasized the role of the masses in achieving change, anticipating his pupil Nicolae Bălcescu. He criticized the boyars for impeding social progress, believing the lower classes would have to take power by force. Thus, he naturally joined the revolutionary movement from its first days. Writing to Bariț on June 12, 1848, he welcomed the “new era” based on principles of liberté, égalité, fraternité, and heralded the constitution as “an enchanted word, a joyous deed”. Appointed by the provisional government, he served as administrator of Ilfov County (June 23–August 7) and of Dolj County (August 7–September 22). In late June, he was ordered to lead the government members back from their temporary refuge at Rucăr. In September, at Craiova, he orchestrated the burning of Regulamentul Organic. He also tried to stop a messenger from Ottoman military commander Fuad Efendi to the pasha of the Vidin Sanjak, seeking reinforcements to crush the revolution in Oltenia. He remained loyal to the movement until the end, calling for constitutional principles to be applied.

Fired from his teaching job, Florian was given a passport thanks to the intervention of his close friend Gheorghe Magheru. He stopped at Sibiu, where he was named secretary of the Romanian National Committee. After Transylvania’s own revolution was defeated, he attempted to seek refuge in Wallachia. Arrested in Ploiești in May 1849, he was sent to Râmnicu Vâlcea and Bucharest, investigated, tried and deported for three years.

=== Aftermath and legacy ===
In 1853, Florian was chief editor of the Brașov Telegraful Român newspaper, where he launched a sustained campaign in favor of a national culture and of the Romanian language. He argued for replacing Romanian Cyrillic with the Latin alphabet, and for phonetic spelling. Similarly careful phrasing and reasoned arguments were also employed in an 1840-1841 work he co-wrote, endorsing the use of French neologisms. He returned to Bucharest in late 1853, and was named head of the Brâncovenesc Hospital, where he remained until 1860. By 1857, he was arguing that the entire territory inhabited by Romanians should be considered their fatherland. In 1858, on the eve of the union of the Principalities, he published a monograph on Michael the Brave, suggesting that the ruler had united all Romanians into a single state.

In 1865, shortly after the University of Bucharest was founded, Florian began teaching a course on world history, but illness soon forced him to retire. From 1866 to 1872, he belonged to a council on public education. His health steadily deteriorated until his death in 1887.

As a historian, Florian was an important precursor to later scholars. He was among the first to display a modern, synthesized view of the Romanian people’s past. His books Idee repede de istoria prințipatului Țării Românești (1835¬1838), Manual de istoria prințipatului României (1839) and Patria, patriotul și patriotismul (1843) express a romantic view of history as a magic mirror of bygone eras and a key to the future. Moreover, he used the historic perspective to justify the existence of his nation under liberty. Setting down bold ideas, he sought to impart a vision that borrowed from the advances made by contemporary European science.
