= Samuil Micu-Klein =

Romanian academic (1745–1806)

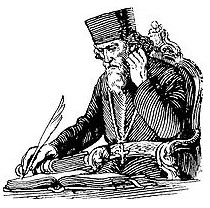
- Samuil Micu Klein
- Born: 1745; Sadu, Principality of Transylvania, Habsburg Empire
- Died: 13 May 1806; Buda, Kingdom of Hungary, Habsburg Empire
- Occupations: Theologian; historian; philologist
- Era: Enlightenment
- Movement: Transylvanian School
- Writing career
- Language: Latin, Romanian
- Notable work: Elementa linguae daco-romanae sive valachicae

Samuil Micu-Klein (September 1745 – 13 May 1806) was a Romanian Greek-Catholic theologian, historian, philologist and philosopher, a member of the Enlightenment-era movement of Transylvanian School (Şcoala Ardeleană). He is the author of Elementa linguae daco-romanae sive valachicae, a book which is the reference point for the start of Modern Romanian language period.

== Biography ==
Born as Maniu Micu in the Transylvanian village of Sadu, in the Principality of Transylvania (now in Sibiu County, Romania), he was the son of a Greek-Catholic protopope and the nephew of bishop Inocenţiu Micu-Klein.

He began to study at the Seminary of Blaj and he joined the Order of Saint Basil in 1762, taking the religious name Samoil. Micu received a scholarship in 1762 and began studying at the Catholic Pázmáneum University of Vienna. There is little known about his life in Vienna, but it is known he was attracted to science, studying experimental physics, mechanics and mathematics, in addition to theology and philosophy.

In 1772, returning to Blaj to teach ethics and mathematics at the Seminary, Klein met and befriended bishop Grigore Maior, whom he accompanied in visits throughout his diocese, trying to win converts to Greek-Catholicism. These trips proved to be useful in his study of the Romanian language, especially of the language spoken by the peasants, gathering materials for future grammar. Klein was also interested in Romanian folklore, his writings being one of the earliest works on it.

In 1774, he finished writing a work of history named De ortu progressu conversione valachorum episcopis item archiepiscopis et metropolitis eorum, which talked about the Roman origins of the Romanians and the origins of their faith in the Roman Christian Church in ancient Dacia. Apparently, his goal was to make the bishopric become a metropolis, so it would no longer belong to the Archdiocese of Esztergom.

He went to Vienna in 1779 to become a prefect of studies at the Saint Barbara College, where he published in 1780, together with Gheorghe Sincai, the first Romanian grammar: Elementa linguae daco-romanae sive valachicae.

Klein returned to Blaj, and between 1782 and 1804, he was very productive both in his translations and in writing original works:

- translation of textbooks for Blaj schools
- translation of over seventy-seven titles and 7,500 pages from the Church Fathers
- a history of Romania entitled Scurtă cunoştinţă a istoriei Românilor (1792)
- a translation of The Granite Matrix (1794)
- a translation of the bible (Biblia de la Blaj, 1795)
- a four-volume Latin draft of Istoria, lucrurile şi întâmplările Românilor (1800, though only an 1805 translation to Romanian survived)

and Cartea de rugăciuni (‘Book of Prayers’, printed at Vienna in 1779) in which he used for the first time the etymological alphabet.

He came in conflict with Ioan Bob, voting against his appointment as bishop. The resentment between the two man materialized in Bob's censorship against Micu-Klein's writings and the refused request made by Micu-Klein to dissolve his monastic vow. Even so, he managed to print in 1800 Istoria și lucrurile și întâmplările românilor - his main history book - in which he promoted the idea of Dacian extermination and that Romanians are solely descending from Romans settled in Dacia. He participated in the regional cultural life, meeting with Johann Christian von Engel and Ioan Piariu-Molnar, among others.

Klein moved to Buda in 1804 to become the editor at the University of Buda press for the Romanian-language books, hoping that this would allow him to publish his historical works, a project which did not materialise because of his death just two years later.
