= Old Romanian =

Historical stage of the Romanian language

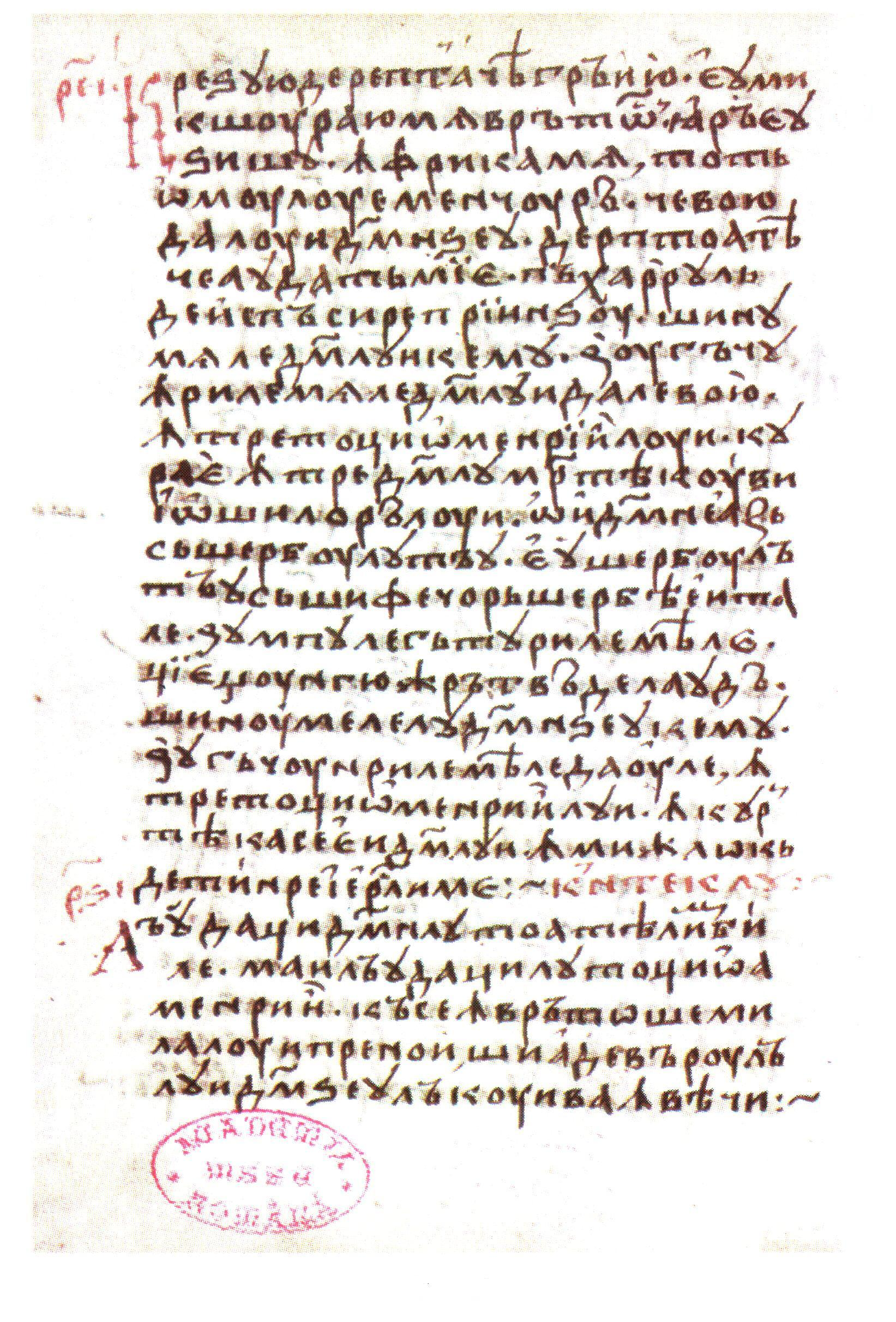
A page from Hurmuzaki Psalter

Old Romanian (Romanian: română veche) is the period of the Romanian language from the 16th century until 1780. It continues the intermediary stage when the dialect continuum known as Daco-Romanian dialects or graiuri developed from Common Romanian, and Modern Romanian – the period of Romanian language set in post-Enlightenment times.

== Overview ==
Attested words in documents written in Slavonic, Latin, or Hungarian over the current territory of Romania prior to the 16th century bridge the period between Common Romanian and the first written documents. The literary stage begins with the oldest preserved Romanian writings such as Neacșu's letter and the Rhotacising Texts. Religious literary texts written in Romanian appear first during this period of time, followed by historical chronicles and the popular literary texts, and translations such as the narratives Varlaam și Ioasaf and Alexandria. The period is characterised by the advent of the printed books and the almost exclusive use of the Romanian Cyrillic alphabet.

== Pre-literary and literary history ==
Latin gave way to Romance languages after the 7th century and the period of the local idiom when all Eastern Romance languages were still in contact with each other is known as Common Romanian. In the 9th century Common Romanian already had a structure very distinct from the other Romance languages, with major differences in grammar, morphology, and phonology and was a member of the Balkan language area. It contained around a hundred loans from Slavic languages, including words such as trup (body, flesh), as well as some Greek language loans via Vulgar Latin, but no Hungarian and Turkish words, as these peoples had yet to arrive in the region. Before the 11th century, Common Romanian split in two geographically separated groups due to the settlement of Slavs in the area and the formation of the South Slavic states. One was in the northern part of the Balkan peninsula from which the Daco-Romanian branch of Common Romanian subsequently formed, the other one was in the south of the peninsula where the Aromanian branch of Common Romanian presumably was spoken.

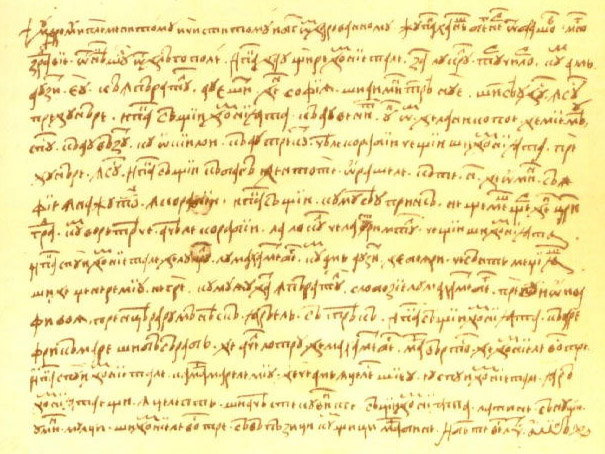
Neacșu's letter is the oldest surviving document written in Old Romanian that can be precisely dated

Before the 16th century the language is thought to have been divided in varieties, without a standardised form. The earliest writings, with Cyrillic script, seem to have started in the second half of the 15th century but none of them have survived until today. Church Slavonic was primarily used instead by both the church and the Princely Chancery, in both Moldavia and Wallachia – the two countries founded in the 14th century – for administrative and cultural purposes. The oldest preserved texts are Neacșu's letter which can be dated to 29 or 30 June 1521 based on the historical account it describes, and a number of manuscripts known together as Rhotacising Texts (i.e.: showing rhotacism of intervocalic /n/). The Rhotacising Texts (Note: Psaltirea Hurmuzaki, Codicele Voronețean, Psaltirea Voronețeană, Psaltirea Scheiană, and others) are religious writings from Moldavia and carry evidence of being translations of manuscripts written in the other languages used in the Banat-Hunedoara area. Of them, Hurmuzaki Psalter, a Romanian copy of a bilingual Church Slavonic-Romanian Psalter, has been dated between 1491–1504 by watermarks, making it the oldest preserved manuscript in Romanian.

From the second half of the 16th century and onwards Romanian starts to be used in the chronicles of Moldavia. Probably drawing from Letopisețul de la Bistrița, a manuscript in Church Slavonic narrating main Moldavian events from 1359 up to 1519, the nobleman Grigore Ureche (c. 1590–1647) wrote the first chronicle in Romanian, having recognised the linguistic connection between Latin and Romanian, and the unity of the language spoken in Moldavia and across the Carpathian Mountains. His work was continued by Miron Costin and Ion Neculce, and it peaked with Dimitrie Cantemir who was the first to write a biography, and a novel (Istoria ieroglifică) in Romanian. In Wallachia the historical writing developed later and is represented mainly by stolnic Constantin Cantacuzino (c. 1639–1716) and monk Radu Popescu (c. 1655–1729), and Romanian language writing would even regress during Phanariote rule, in particular in the epistolary segment. The use of Romanian in the 16th century in the juridical and administrative spheres was sporadic and only gradually implemented from the reign of Michael the Brave.

=== Printed literature ===
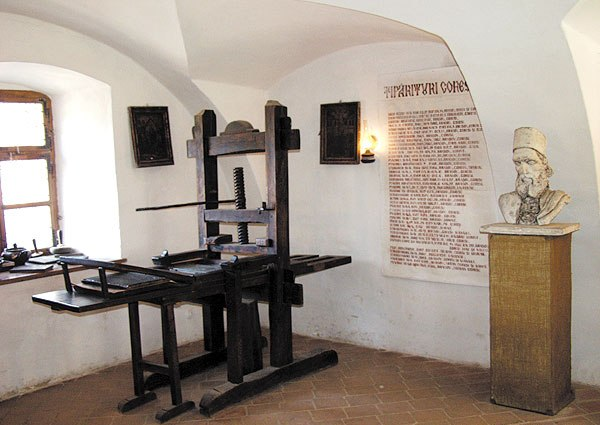
The room and printing press of Deacon Coresi, Brașov

The printing press was introduced to Wallachia during the reign of Radu IV the Great (1467–1508), and placed in Târgoviște, then the capital of the country. The leading work was done by Hieromonk Makarije and the first books, written in Church Slavonic, were the religious texts Liturgy Book from 1508, the Oktoih from 1510, and the Four Gospels of Târgoviște from 1512. The first printing house in Transylvania was established by magistrate Theobaldus Gryphius at Sibiu, a city that was experiencing the Lutheran Reformation. Here, in 1544, the Catehismul românesc ("Romanian Catechism") was printed, the first Romanian-language book, by Filip Moldoveanu (also known as Philip the Painter or Philip Maler). Less than 20 years after, Deacon Coresi would print at Brașov a series of books (Note: Întrebarea creștinească (1560), Tetraevanghelul (1561), Apostolul (1563), Cazania (1564, 1581), Molitvenicul (1564), Psaltirea (1564, 1570), Pravila și Apostolii (1570, 1580), Liturghierul (1570)) in Romanian, along with others in Church Slavonic. Most of the early translations borrowed from Church Slavonic texts. An exception, Palia de la Orăștie, relied mostly on Hungarian-language texts. Also rare at the beginning of the period are texts written with the Latin alphabet, a Calvinist anthology of the Psalms written around 1570 and a Tatăl Nostru ("Pater Noster") published in 1593 in Krakow being a couple of them.

Numerous printing houses functioned, either intermittently or continuously, over the next two centuries in cities like Alba Iulia, Brașov, Bucharest, Buzău, Câmpulung, Cluj-Napoca, Iași, Sebeș, Sibiu, Snagov, and Târgoviște. Some books were printed outside the Romanian language area for example the Psalter versified by Archbishop Dosoftei of Moldova was printed in Univ in 1673, and translations from Italian and German were printed in Milan around 1760 by the Romanian printer Vlad Boțulescu.

== Internal history ==
=== Phonology ===
Old Romanian had a phonemic inventory of seven vowel and twenty-nine consonants, yet differences existed from one subperiod to another.

==== Vowels ====
Stressed [ə] from Common Romanian developed into the vowel [ɨ] in the pre-literary stage of the language. The Old Romanian vowel system is preserved in the current phonology. The asyllabic final sound [u]'s devoicing was not complete in Old Romanian.

	Front	Central	Back
Close	i	ɨ	u
Mid	e	ə	o
Open		a	

==== Consonants ====
Old Romanian retained the consonants [ʎ] and [ɲ] from Common Romanian, but with a limited distribution, mainly in the Banat-Hunedoara-Oltenia area.

		Labial	Dental/ Alveolar		Post- alveolar	Palatal	Velar	Glottal
		Labial	central	sibilant	Post- alveolar	Palatal	Velar	Glottal
Stop	voiceless	p	t			c	k	
Stop	voiced	b	d			ɟ	ɡ	
Affricate	voiceless			t͡s	t͡ʃ			
Affricate	voiced			d͡z	d͡ʒ			
Fricative	voiceless	f		s	ʃ			h
Fricative	voiced	v		z	ʒ			
Nasal		m	n			ɲ		
Trill			r					
Approximant	lateral		l			ʎ		
Approximant	median					j	w	

In addition, it also had two consonants, /nn/ and /rr/, characterised as intense, after which the front vowels [e] and [i] underwent velarization. According to Kim Schulte the Old Romanian had a tapped ɾ and trill r.

==== Allomorphy ====
Like in Modern Romanian, there were complex patterns of allomorphy, in particular affecting the lexical root. Voiced dental alveolar affricate [d͡z] > [z] is found in Muntenia, Oltenia, and central Transylvanian varieties (as well as in the Istro-Romanian and the Megleno-Romanian dialects) but not overall in Moldova, Maramureș, Banat, and in the Aromanian dialects.

Particular sound changes took place in Old Romanian such as merger of [ɲ] and [ʎ] as a glide and reclosure of the diphthong [ea] before an unstressed [e] (for example leage became lege), and as such in Modern Romanian the [ea] alternant no longer appears when followed by [e]. Vowel centralisation where [i], [e], [ea] acquired centralised articulations in the form [ɨ], [ə], [a] also occasionally took particular forms in Old Romanian either as sporadically triggered by sibilants and by the affricates [t͡s] and [d͡z] (*țeri > țări) or affecting mid front vowels triggered by immediately preceding labial consonants but not when the immediately following vowel is a front one (*vesku > vâsc ‘mistletoe’ but *veneri > vineri ‘Friday’). Unlike in Megleno-Romanian and the northern and western varieties of Aromanian, in Old Romanian preceding yod or central vowels acted on following central vowels which become fronted (for example cară - cărând).

=== Morphology ===
The complex morphology of Romanian was already developed in Old Romanian period, with its vestigial inflexional case system comprising two case forms and determiners and desinences that mark the vocative, both in the singular and in the plural. Overall, derivational morphology in Romanian tends to be of a more agglutinative character than inflexional morphology.

Compared to the modern language, Old Romanian had a higher degree of unpredictability of plural endings with feminine nouns taking either -e or -i (inemă–inemi, but grădinĕ–grădine) and neuter nouns either -e or -uri (veștmênt - veștminte/veșmânturi). Verbal forms showed differences compared to the standard language. The simple perfect presented two variants in the first century of the period: the one preserved, with stress on the inflectional ending (făcui - I did, mersei - I went), and one with stress on the root (fàciu - I did, merșu - I went). Synthetic and analytic forms were used for pluperfect, imperfect, and conditional for example mersere vs ară mearge could both express the conditional "she/he/they would go".

=== Syntax and grammar ===
Old Romanian presented aspects that were similar to other old Romance languages but have disappeared in the transition to Modern Romanian. The preposition de was used frequently for partitive constructions, similar to its use in French and Italian (for example in French: J’ai vu deux de ces garcons) before gradually being replaced by din (de + în). Likewise, and like in other Romance languages, de marked the prepositional genitive (ex: Curtea de Argeș) along with the inflectional genitive that is used more frequently in Modern Romanian. It employed the determiner cel (from Latin: eccum ille) as a proclitic definite article. Rarely and in particular conditions, an expletive pronominal subject in the form of el was used together with a fi - "to be": El venise atunce vremea troianilor de perit - "It was then time for the Trojans to die". Modern Romanian constructions lack the equivalent of French il and English it in such cases: Venise atunci vremea troianilor să piară.

Among the segments that experienced the most changes during this period is the nominal domain. From the 16th century new determiners developed with idiosyncratic morphemic and distributional features. The determiner cel appeared frequently preceding a bare noun or a prenominal adjective and its grammaticalisation in structures of the type omul cel bun - "the good man" is an innovation of Romanian among Eastern Romance languages. Grammar of functional elements such as lui stabilised to their current form together with other form-distribution specialisation such as of demonstratives acesta,acela.

In the verbal domain, the subjunctive, defined by the already fixed marker să with history traceable to Common Romanian (i.e. the same marker is used in the other Eastern Romance languages) and similar in evolution to the Greek particle na, tends to extend its use by replacing the infinitive in several contexts. The old language also showed the proliferation of numerous tense and aspect periphrases with a decreasing frequency towards the end of the period. Notable are also the competition between analytic and synthetic forms. One example in the case of the preterite which continues the Latin perfect indicative and the compound past. The more numerous forms at the beginning of the Old Romanian period were the simple past (Scriș eu, călugărița Mariia) but gradually a distinction between "impersonal narration" and "discourse" develops with the two forms used in the same context to express the two different interpretations: În lume era, și lumea pren el s-au făcut, și lumea pe el nu cunoscu. Another example comes from the use of pluperfect and double compound perfect, between the synthetic form inherited from Latin of the type făcuse and the analytic form of the type era făcut which is likely correspondent to Slavonic pluperfect and which disappeared from the language early on. In the case of the conditional there were numerous periphrases with the auxiliary vrea - "to want" - in combination with the imperfect or the compound past (Note: for example vrea face, am vrut face, vrea fi făcut, am vrut fi făcut but rarely vrea fi făcând) and which will give way to the conditional formed with auxiliary aș (also ară in Old Romanian). The vrea type conditional is still frequent in Banat. As in the other examples there was a synthetic conditional, similar to the future subjunctive in the Ibero-Romance languages and formed by the perfect root followed by the suffix -re introduced by the particle să which could produce unique periphrases: Se fure faptu păcatu - "If he has committed sin". The synthetic conditional is found in Aromanian and the root+re form also in Istro-Romanian.

=== Vocabulary ===
The main difference between Old Romanian and Modern Romanian in terms of vocabulary is the number of loanwords from Romance languages (mainly French) and from Latin, the end of the Old Romanian period coinciding with the activity of the Transylvanian School culminating with the publishing of Elementa linguae daco-romanae sive valachicae, subscribed to the process of modernisation of Romanian language. Prior to this, counting from the fifteenth century, about 1,100 words of Latin or Romance origin entered the language either directly, (Note: for example patrie, căpitan, caracter, armată, carnaval) some with forms that were revisited during the modern period (eleghie, elexie, comendă versus modern elegie, elecție, comandă), or from contact languages such as German, (Note: capital, contribuțion, memorial, provezion) Hungarian, (Note: evanghelion, formălui, lămpaș, coleghiom) Polish, Russian, and Ukrainian, (Note: caștelean, maistru, aptică, adiutant) or even Turkish. (Note: cașcaval) However, not all remained in the language, being often just an ephemeric apparition in the language use by an author or another. Others, as mentioned, were reinterpreted during the following period.

The effects of the standardisation of the language did not only bring it closer to other Romance languages but also, haphazardly, strengthened some Slavic features, for example the particle da of Slavic origin (most likely Bulgarian and corresponding to English yes, French oui and so on) used mostly in the Wallachian dialect and which appears in Romanian language texts from the early nineteenth century, replaced Old Romanian methods of indicating agreement or acceptance through non-specialised words such as așa, adevĕrat, bine or the repetition of the verb in the question (for example "Ai vĕḑut pe Ion?" "Vĕḑut!"). This generalisation happened as a consequence of modeling of the Romanian syntax after the French one, mainly through translations of French language books, towards the end of the period.
