= Palia de la Orăștie =

1582 translation of the Pentateuch

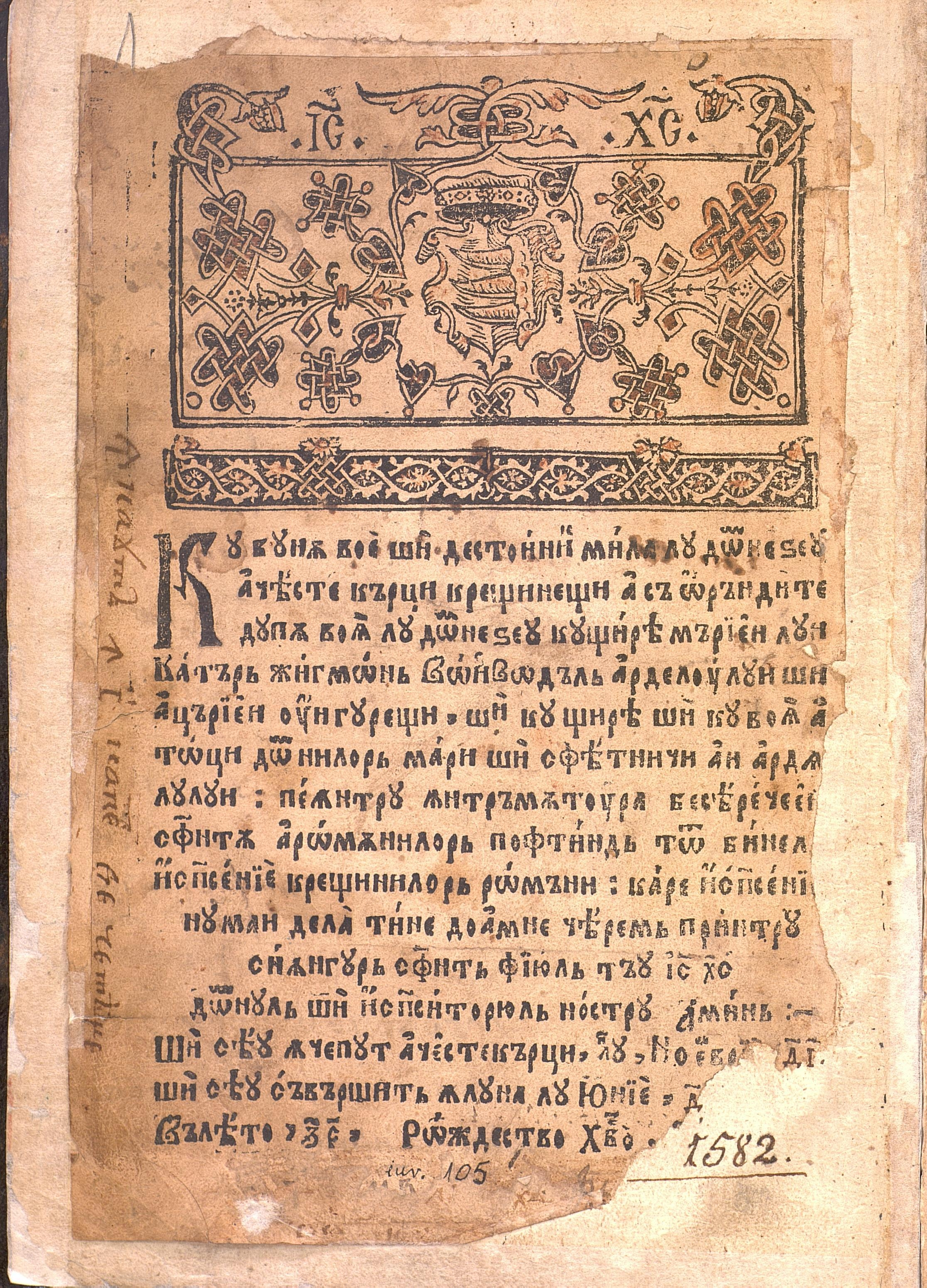
Front page with the emblem of the Báthory family

Palia de la Orăștie is the first known translation of the Pentateuch in Romanian. The book was printed in 1582 in the town of Orăștie, then a local center of reformation within the Principality of Transylvania, under the patronage of Stephen Báthory.

The importance of the book is three-fold: it is the earliest known translation, even partial, of the Old Testament in Romanian, it is the foremost document of the Romanian branch of the Reformed Diocese of Transylvania from that time, and it is one the few pre-modern books using the Banat Romanian dialect.

== Background ==
Following the Battle of Mohács the authority of the Catholic Church in Hungary was challenged by the Protestant reformation among the residents of Transylvania. Romanians had been overwhelmingly aligned with the Orthodox Church, yet in this context Reformation spread to their community, centered around Orăștie and in particular among the small nobility and clerics from Hunedoara area, some of which previously converted to Catholicism.

The book is part of a serie of translations created by the Romanian branch of the Reformed Diocese of Transylvania, preceded by The Romanian Catechism of Sibiu (1544), The Romanian Catechism of Brașov (1560), and The Four Gospels (1561).

== Content ==
Palia (gr. παλαιά "old") refers to the Old Testament. In the preserved preface it says that the authors planned to translate all five books of the Pentateuch but only the first two, Genesis and Exodus, were completed. The Preface of the book covers eleven pages and five sections: an acknowledgement at the beginning and end, the list of Old Testament books without the Apocrypha, summaries of the Pentateuch books, the three types of Old Testament laws, and the list of translators. The two books translated in Romanian (Genesis and Exodus) were named Bitia and Ishodul.

It contains 161 double-sided pages, and it was translated into Romanian by: Mihai Tordaș (Turdach Mihaly), the protestant bishop of Banat and Hunedoara; Archirie Pamadopleu, protopop of Hunedoara; preacher Stephen Herczeg of Caransebeș; Ephrem Zacham Bar Ephraim, teacher of literature and Biblical languages (Hebrew, Ancient Greek and Latin) in Sebeș; and preacher Moisi Pesahiel of Lugoj. The expenses for translation and printing were covered by the nobleman Ferenc Geszti. The printing was done by the deacons Șerban (the son of Coresi) and Marian Diacul between 14th of November 1581 and 14th of July 1582.

Researchers have noted that although the text is introduced as a translation from "Hebrew language, Greek language, and Serbian language" such books were not directly used and the real sources were Latin and Hungarian language religious books, in particular the Pentateuch printed at Kolozsvár in 1551 by Gáspár Heltai and a version of Vulgate. The authors used a number of words of Old Church Slavonic provenience with which Orthodox Romanians were familiar and which were frequently found in other Romanian religious texts (for example: dosadă, izvodi, milcui, proceti, voditură).

The book is the first Romanian language text where the endonym appears with /o/ in the spelling (român), whereas the spelling with /u/ is generally considered the etymologically correct one (ie rumân). Alexandru Rosetti saw this as an innovation ment to highlight the filiation of Romanians from Romans however it is not known if this change was the act of one of the translators or one of the printers. Linguist Vasile Arvinte notes a number of instances where unaccentuated /o/ alternates with /u/ in the same word through the text (Note: for example: conosc and cunosc, micșora and micșura, dormi and durmi) or words which would normally have /o/ and used /u/ instead. (Note: urbitură, uspăț, usteni)

== Editions ==
Besides the original, the book had a couple of reprints. The earliest was in 1925 by Mario Roques who, however, only managed to complete the first of the two parts. In 1968 a full edition plus the text of the Gáspár Heltai's Pentateuch were published under the supervision of Viorica Pamfil.

The latest edition is from 2007, with analyses about the text and language used in the book by Alexandru Gafton and Vasile Arvinte, respectively.

== See also ==
- Old Romanian
