= Romanian language =

Eastern Romance language

Romanian
- Daco-Romanian
- limba română, românește, română (Note: лимба ромынэ, ромынеште, ромынэ in Moldovan Cyrillic, uniquely used in Transnistria.)
- Pronunciation: [roˈmɨnə]
- Native to: Romania; Moldova
- Region: Southeastern Europe; Eastern Europe; Central Europe
- Ethnicity: Romanians (including Moldovans and Timok Vlachs)
- Native speakers: 22 million (2020)
- Language family: Indo-European: Italic; Latino-Faliscan; Latin; Romance; Eastern; Northern Romanian? (Note: The internal classification of the Eastern Romance languages presented in Petrucci (1999) proposes a bipartite split into Northern and Southern branches, with the Northern branch splitting into Istro-Romanian and Daco-Romanian. By contrast, the classification presented within Glottolog v4.8 proposes a bipartite split between Aromanian and Northern Romanian, the latter of which is further split into Istro-Romanian and Eastern Romanian, from which Daco-Romanian and Megleno-Romanian are hypothesized to have split.); Eastern Romanian?; Romanian
- Early forms: Proto-Indo-European: Proto-Italic; Old Latin; Vulgar Latin; Proto-Romance; Common Romanian
- Dialects: Transylvanian; Crișana; Moldavian; Banat; Wallachian; Maramureș; Bukovinian; Oltenian
- Writing system: Latin (Romanian alphabet); Cyrillic; Moldovan Cyrillic alphabet (Transnistria only); Romanian Cyrillic alphabet (historical); Romanian Braille

Official status
- Official language in: Romania; Moldova; Transnistria (as "Moldovan"); Vojvodina (Serbia); European Union
- Recognised minority language in: Hungary; Serbia (both as Romanian and "Vlach"); Ukraine
- Regulated by: Romanian Academy

Language codes
- ISO 639-1: ro
- ISO 639-2: rum (B) ron (T)
- ISO 639-3: ron
- Glottolog: roma1327
- Linguasphere: 51-AAD-c
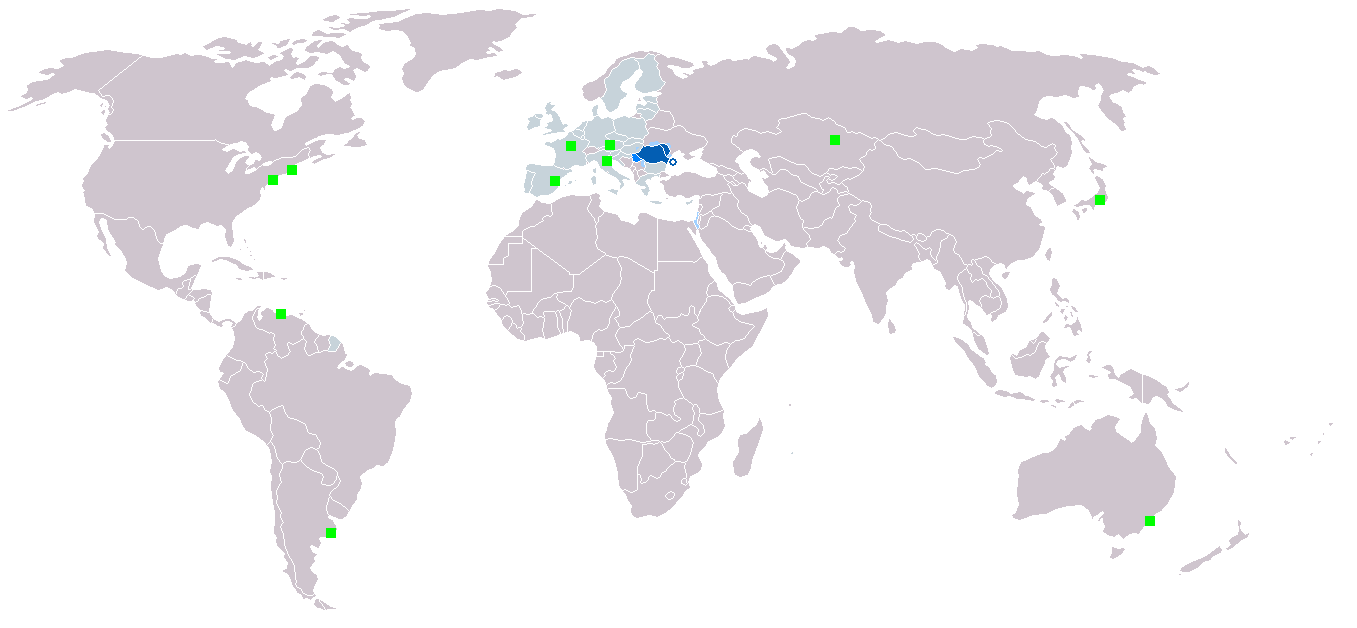
- Blue: region where Romanian is the dominant language. Cyan: areas with a notable minority of Romanian speakers.

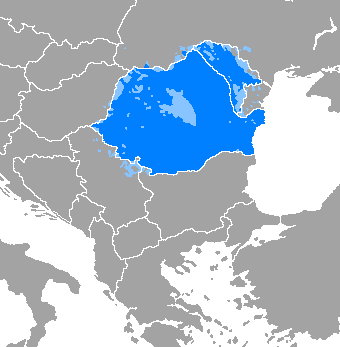
- Distribution of the Romanian language in Romania, Moldova and surroundings

Native from Bucharest, Romania, speaking Romanian. The Romanian dialect from Bucharest is standard Romanian (from the region of Muntenia, part of the historical Wallachia).

Romanian (obsolete spelling: Roumanian; endonym: limba română [ˈlimba roˈmɨnə], or românește [romɨˈneʃte], lit. 'in Romanian') is the official and main language of Romania and Moldova. Romanian is part of the Eastern Romance sub-branch of Romance languages, a linguistic group that evolved from several dialects of Vulgar Latin which separated from the Western Romance languages in the course of the period from the 5th to the 8th centuries. To distinguish it within the Eastern Romance languages, in comparative linguistics it is called Daco-Romanian as opposed to its closest relatives, Aromanian, Megleno-Romanian, and Istro-Romanian. It is also spoken as a minority language by stable communities in the countries surrounding Romania (Bulgaria, Hungary, Serbia and Ukraine), and by the large Romanian diaspora. In total, it is spoken by 22 million people as a first language.

Romanian was also known as Moldovan in Moldova, although the Constitutional Court of Moldova ruled in 2013 that "the official language of Moldova is Romanian". (Note: The constitution of the Republic of Moldova referred to the country's language as Moldovan, whilst the 1991 Declaration of Independence named the official language Romanian. In December 2013, an official decision of the Constitutional Court of Moldova ruled that the Declaration of Independence takes precedence over the Constitution and that the state language is therefore Romanian, not 'Moldovan'. "Moldovan court rules official language is 'Romanian,' replacing Soviet-flavored 'Moldovan'".) On 16 March 2023, the Moldovan Parliament approved a law on referring to the national language as Romanian in all legislative texts and the constitution. On 22 March, the president of Moldova, Maia Sandu, promulgated the law.

== Overview ==
The history of the Romanian language started in the Roman provinces north of the Jireček Line in Classical antiquity but there are three main hypotheses about its exact territory: the autochthony thesis (it developed in left-Danube Dacia only), the discontinuation thesis (it developed in right-Danube provinces only), and the "as-well-as" thesis that supports the language development on both sides of the Danube. Between the 6th and 8th century, following the accumulated tendencies inherited from the vernacular spoken in this large area and, to a much smaller degree, the influences from native dialects, and in the context of a lessened power of the Roman central authority the language evolved into Common Romanian. This proto-language then came into close contact with the Slavic languages and subsequently divided into Aromanian, Megleno-Romanian, Istro-Romanian, and Daco-Romanian. Due to limited attestation between the 6th and 16th century, entire stages from its history are re-constructed by researchers, often with proposed relative chronologies and loose limits.

From the 12th or 13th century, official documents and religious texts were written in Old Church Slavonic, a language that had a similar role to Medieval Latin in Western Europe. The oldest dated text in Romanian is a letter written in 1521 using Cyrillic letters, the same alphabet that was used during the development of printing. The period after 1780, starting with the writing of its first grammar books, represents the modern age of the language, during which time the Latin alphabet started to gradually become official, the literary language was standardized, and a large number of words from Modern Latin and other Romance languages entered the lexis.

In the process of language evolution from fewer than 2500 attested words from Late Antiquity to a lexicon of over 150,000 words in its contemporary form, Romanian showed a high degree of lexical permeability, reflecting contact with Thraco-Dacian, Slavic languages (including Old Slavic, Serbian, Bulgarian, Ukrainian, and Russian), Greek, Hungarian, German, Turkish, and to languages that served as cultural models during and after the Age of Enlightenment, in particular French. This lexical permeability is continuing today with the introduction of English words.

Yet while the overall lexis was enriched with foreign words and internal constructs, in accordance with the history and development of the society and the diversification in semantic fields, the fundamental lexicon—the core vocabulary used in everyday conversation—remains governed by inherited elements from the Latin spoken in the Roman provinces bordering Danube, which form the indispensable structural base of coherent expression.

== History ==
=== Common Romanian ===
Romanian descended from the Latin spoken in the Roman provinces of Southeastern Europe north of the Jireček Line (a hypothetical boundary between the dominance of Latin and Greek influences). The exact geographic origin and continuity (especially after Roman withdrawal from Dacia in the 3rd century) is still debated among historians.

Most scholars agree that two major dialects had developed from Common Romanian by the 10th century. Daco-Romanian (the official language of Romania and Moldova) and Istro-Romanian (a language spoken today by no more than 2,000 people in Istria) descended from the northern dialect. Two other languages, Aromanian and Megleno-Romanian, developed from the southern version of Common Romanian. These two languages are now spoken in lands to the south of the Jireček Line.

Of the features that individualize Common Romanian, inherited from Latin or subsequently developed, of particular importance are:

- appearance of schwa (written as ă in Romanian) vowel;
- growth of the plural inflectional ending -uri for the neuter gender;
- analytic present conditional (ex: Daco-Romanian aș cânta);
- analytic future with an auxiliary derived from Latin volo (ex: Aromanian va s-cântu);
- enclisis of the definite article (ex. Istro-Romanian câre – cârele);
- nominal declension with two case forms in the singular feminine.

=== Old Romanian ===
The use of the denomination Romanian (română) for the language and use of the demonym Romanians (Români) for speakers of this language predate the foundation of the modern Romanian state. Romanians always used the general term rumân/român or regional terms such as ardeleni (or ungureni), moldoveni or munteni to designate themselves. Both the name of rumână or rumâniască for the Romanian language and the self-designation rumân/român are attested as early as the 16th century, by various foreign travelers into the Carpathian Romance-speaking space, as well as in other historical documents written in Romanian at that time such as Cronicile Țării Moldovei (The Chronicles of the land of Moldova) by Grigore Ureche.

The few allusions to the use of Romanian in writing as well as common words, anthroponyms and toponyms preserved in the Old Church Slavonic religious writings and chancellery documents, attested prior to the 16th century, along with the analysis of graphemes show that the writing of Romanian with the Cyrillic alphabet started in the second half of the 15th century.

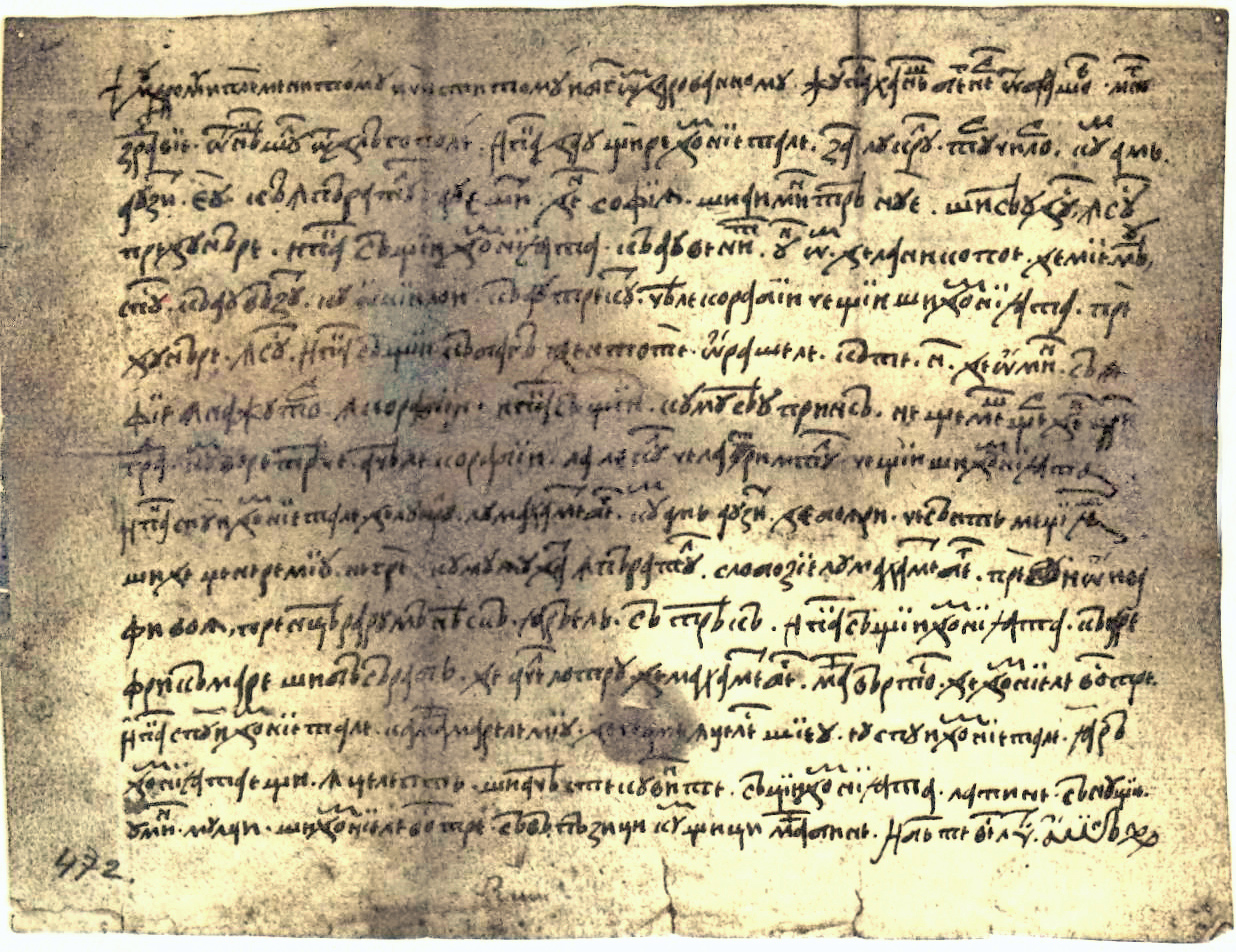
Neacșu's letter is the oldest surviving document written in Old Romanian that can be precisely dated

The Hurmuzaki Psalter (Psaltirea Hurmuzaki) is the oldest writing in Romanian, dated on the basis of watermarks between 1491–1504. It is a copy of an older, fifteenth-century translation of the Psalter, which was bilingual (written in Church Slavonic, with Romanian translation after each verse). The oldest Romanian document precisely dated is Neacșu's letter (1521) and was written using the Romanian Cyrillic alphabet, which was used until the late 19th century. The letter is the oldest testimony of Romanian epistolary style and uses a prevalent lexis of Latin origin. The slow process of Romanian establishing itself as an official language, used in the public sphere, in literature and ecclesiastically, began in the late 15th century and ended in the early decades of the 18th century, by which time Romanian had begun to be regularly used by the Church. The oldest Romanian texts of a literary nature are liturgical texts of the Eastern Orthodox Church: Psalter (Hurmuzaki Psalter, Scheian Psalter, Psalter of Voroneț) and Apostolos lectionary (Bratu's Codex, Codex of Voroneț). Their origins go back to the 15th century. The fact that they are bilingual writings or descend from bilingual writings shows that the initiative to translate them was prompted by the need to facilitate access to the Church Slavonic liturgical text.

The language spoken during this period had a phonological system of seven vowels and twenty-nine consonants. Particular to Old Romanian are the distribution of /z/, as the allophone of /dz/ from Common Romanian, in the Wallachian and south-east Transylvanian varieties, the presence of palatal sonorants /ʎ/ and /ɲ/, nowadays preserved only regionally in Banat and Oltenia, and the beginning of devoicing of asyllabic [u] after consonants. Text analysis revealed words that are now lost from modern vocabulary or used only in local varieties. These words were of various provenience for example: Latin (cure – to run, mâneca- to leave), Old Church Slavonic (drăghicame – gem, precious stone, prilăsti – to trick, to cheat), Hungarian (bizăntui – to bear witness).

=== Modern Romanian ===
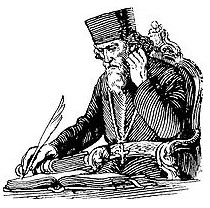
Samuil Micu-Klein

The modern age of Romanian starts in 1780 with the printing in Vienna of a very important grammar book titled Elementa linguae daco-romanae sive valachicae. The author of the book, Samuil Micu-Klein, and the revisor, Gheorghe Șincai, both members of the Transylvanian School, chose to use Latin as the language of the text and presented the phonological and grammatical features of Romanian in comparison to its ancestor. The Modern age of Romanian language can be further divided into three phases: pre-modern or modernizing between 1780 and 1830, modern phase between 1831 and 1880, and contemporary from 1880 onwards.

==== Pre-modern period ====
Beginning with the printing in 1780 of Elementa linguae daco-romanae sive valachicae, the pre-modern phase was characterized by the publishing of school textbooks, appearance of first normative works in Romanian, numerous translations, and the beginning of a conscious stage of re-latinization of the language. Notable contributions, besides that of the Transylvanian School, are the activities of Gheorghe Lazăr, founder of the first Romanian school, and Ion Heliade Rădulescu. The end of this period is marked by the first printing of magazines and newspapers in Romanian, in particular Curierul Românesc and Albina Românească.

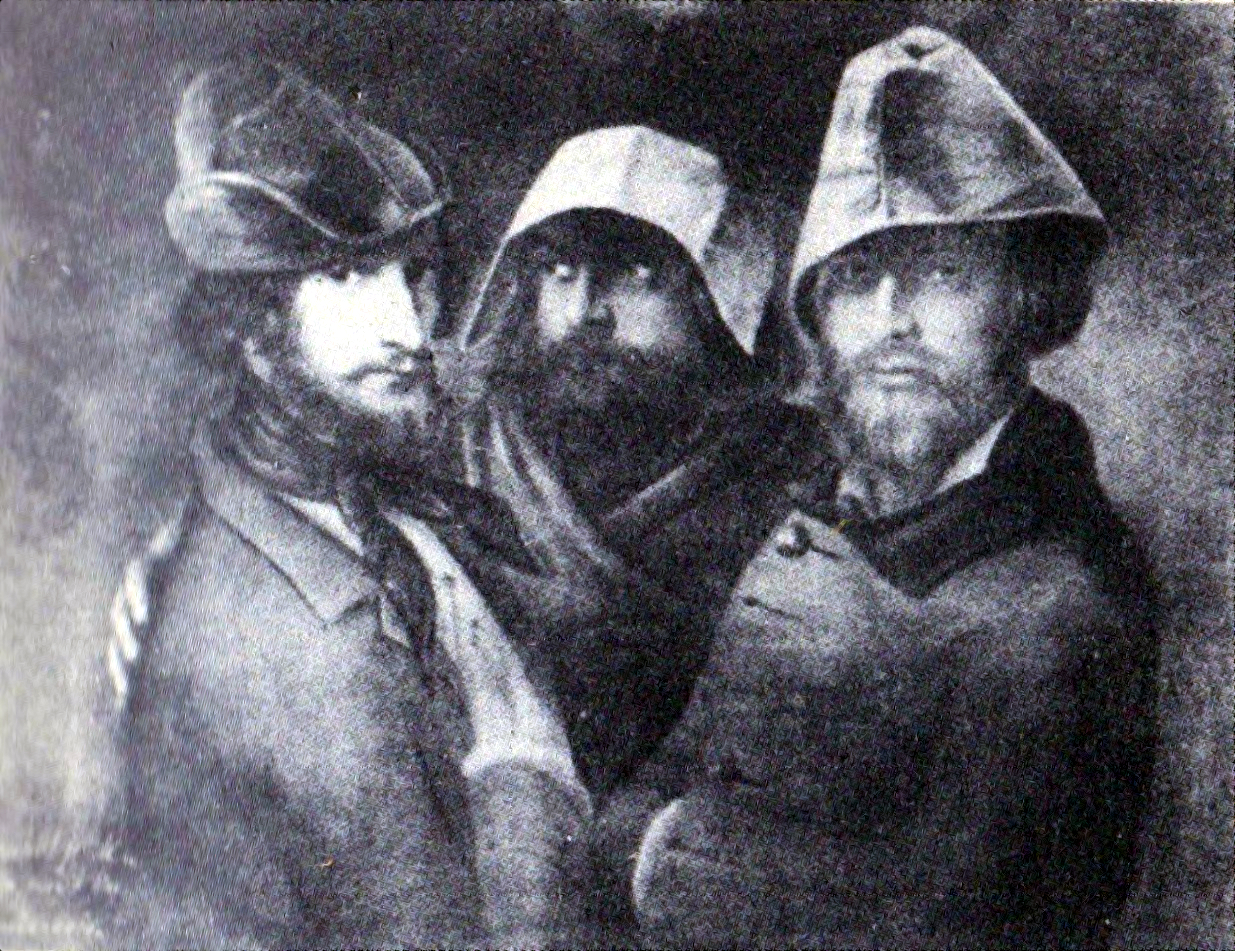
Lithograph of a group portrait by Constantin Daniel Rosenthal, showing Paris-based revolutionaries during the early 1840s. From left: Rosenthal (wearing a Phrygian cap), C. A. Rosetti, Vasile Mălinescu

==== Modern period ====
Starting from 1831 and lasting until 1880 the modern phase is characterized by the development of literary styles: scientific, administrative, and belletristic. It quickly reached a high point with the printing of Dacia Literară, a journal founded by Mihail Kogălniceanu and representing a literary society, which together with other publications like Propășirea and Gazeta de Transilvania spread the ideas of Romantic nationalism and later contributed to the formation of other societies that took part in the Revolutions of 1848. Their members and those that shared their views are collectively known in Romania as "of '48"(pașoptiști), a name that was extended to the literature and writers around this time such as Vasile Alecsandri, Grigore Alexandrescu, Nicolae Bălcescu, Timotei Cipariu.

Between 1830 and 1860 "transitional alphabets" were used, adding Latin letters to the Romanian Cyrillic alphabet. The Latin alphabet became official at different dates in Wallachia and Transylvania – 1860, and Moldova – 1862.

Following the unification of Moldavia and Wallachia further studies on the language were made, culminating with the founding of Societatea Literară Română on 1 April 1866 on the initiative of C. A. Rosetti, an academic society that had the purpose of standardizing the orthography, formalizing the grammar and (via a dictionary) vocabulary of the language, and promoting literary and scientific publications. This institution later became the Romanian Academy.

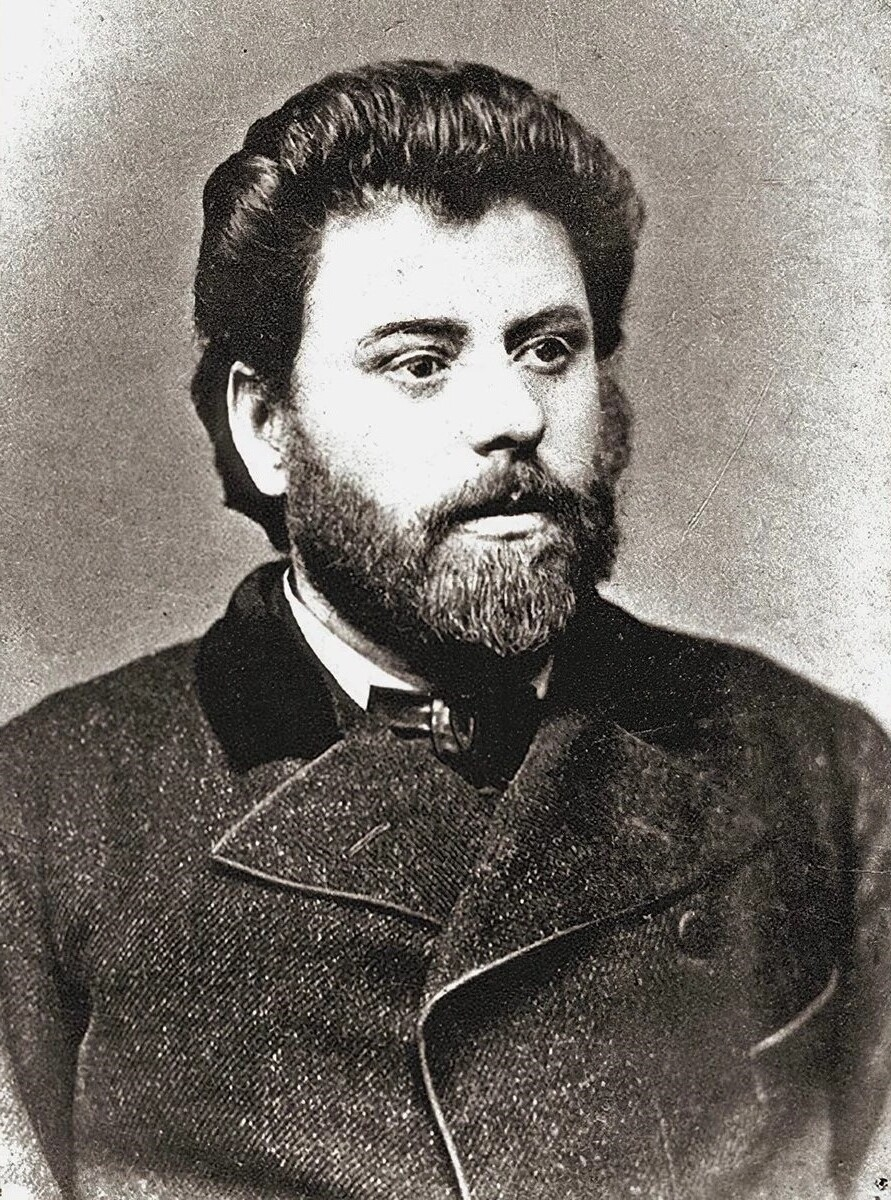
Ion Creangă

==== Contemporary period ====
The third phase of the modern age of Romanian language, starting from 1880 and continuing to this day, is characterized by the prevalence of the supradialectal form of the language, standardized with the express contribution of the school system and Romanian Academy, bringing a close to the process of literary language modernization and development of literary styles. It is distinguished by the activity of Romanian literature classics in its early decades: Mihai Eminescu, Ion Luca Caragiale, Ion Creangă, Ioan Slavici.

The current orthography, with minor reforms to this day and using Latin letters, was fully implemented in 1881, regulated by the Romanian Academy on a fundamentally phonological principle, with few morpho-syntactic exceptions.

==== Modern history of Romanian in Bessarabia ====
The first Romanian grammar was published in Vienna in 1780. Following the annexation of Bessarabia by Russia in 1812, Moldavian was established as an official language in the governmental institutions of Bessarabia, used along with Russian. The publishing works established by Archbishop Gavril Bănulescu-Bodoni were able to produce books and liturgical works in Moldavian between 1815 and 1820.

Bessarabia during the 1812–1918 era witnessed the gradual development of bilingualism. Russian continued to develop as the official language of privilege, whereas Romanian remained the principal vernacular.

The period from 1905 to 1917 was one of increasing linguistic conflict spurred by an increase in Romanian nationalism. In 1905 and 1906, the Bessarabian zemstva asked for the re-introduction of Romanian in schools as a "compulsory language", and the "liberty to teach in the mother language (Romanian language)". At the same time, Romanian-language newspapers and journals began to appear, such as Basarabia (1906), Viața Basarabiei (1907), Moldovanul (1907), Luminătorul (1908), Cuvînt moldovenesc (1913), Glasul Basarabiei (1913). From 1913, the synod permitted that "the churches in Bessarabia use the Romanian language". Romanian finally became the official language with the Constitution of 1923.

=== Historical grammar ===
Romanian has preserved a part of the Latin declension. However, while Latin had six cases, from a morphological viewpoint, Romanian has only three: the nominative/accusative, genitive/dative, and marginally the vocative. Romanian nouns also preserve the neuter gender, although instead of functioning as a separate gender with its own forms in adjectives, the Romanian neuter became a mixture of masculine and feminine. The verb morphology of Romanian has shown the same move towards a compound perfect and future tense as the other Romance languages. Compared with the other Romance languages, during its evolution, Romanian simplified the original Latin tense system.

== Geographic distribution ==
Romanian is spoken mostly in Central, South-Eastern, and Eastern Europe, although speakers of the language can be found all over the world, mostly due to emigration of Romanian nationals and the return of immigrants to Romania back to their original countries. Romanian speakers account for 0.5% of the world's population, and 4% of the Romance-speaking population of the world.

Romanian is the single official and national language in Romania and Moldova, although it shares the official status at regional level with other languages in the Moldovan autonomies of Gagauzia and Transnistria. Romanian is also an official language of the Autonomous Province of Vojvodina in Serbia along with five other languages. Romanian minorities are encountered in Serbia (Timok Valley), Ukraine (Chernivtsi and Odesa oblasts), and Hungary (Gyula). Large immigrant communities are found in Italy, Spain, France, and Portugal.

In 1995, the largest Romanian-speaking community in the Middle East was found in Israel, where Romanian was spoken by 5% of the population. Romanian is also spoken as a second language by people from Arabic-speaking countries who have studied in Romania. It is estimated that almost half a million Middle Eastern Arabs studied in Romania during the 1980s. Small Romanian-speaking communities are to be found in Kazakhstan and Russia. Romanian is also spoken within communities of Romanian and Moldovan immigrants in the United States, Canada and Australia, although they do not make up a large homogeneous community statewide.

Geographic distribution of Romanian
Country	Speakers (%)	Speakers (native)	Country Population
World
World	0.33%	23,623,890	7,035,000,000
Countries where Romanian is an official language
Romania	90.65%	17,263,561	19,043,767
Moldova ^{2}	82.1%	2,184,065	2,681,735
Transnistria (Moldova)^{3}	33.0%	156,600	475,665
Vojvodina (Serbia)	1.04%	18,038	1,740,230
Ukraine ^{5}	0.8%	327,703	48,457,000
Other neighboring European states (except for CIS countries where Romanian is not official)
Hungary	0.14%	13,886	9,937,628
Timok Valley (Serbia)	0.39%	25,702	6,664,007
Bulgaria	0.06%	4,575	7,364,570
CIS countries where Romanian is not official
Russia ^{1}	0.06%	92,675	142,856,536
Kazakhstan ^{1}	0.1%	14,666	14,953,126
Asia (excluding CIS countries)
Israel	1.11%	~82,300	7,412,200
UAE	0.1%	5,000	4,106,427
Singapore	0.02%	1,400	5,535,000
Japan	0.002%	2,185	126,659,683
South Korea	0.0006%	300	50,004,441
China	0.0008%	12,000	1,376,049,000
The Americas
United States	0.049%	154,625	315,091,138
Canada	0.289%	100,610	34,767,250
Argentina	0.03%	13,000	40,117,096
Venezuela	0.036%	10,000	27,150,095
Brazil	0.002%	4,000	190,732,694
Oceania
Australia	0.046%	12,251	26,482,413
New Zealand	0.08%	3,100	4,027,947
Africa
South Africa	0.007%	3,000	44,819,778
^{1} Many are Moldavians who were deported^{2} Data only for the districts on the right bank of Dniester (without Transnistria and the city of Tighina). In Moldova, it is sometimes referred to as the "Moldovan language"^{3} In Transnistria, it is officially called "Moldovan language" and is written in Moldovan Cyrillic alphabet.^{4} Officially divided into Vlachs and Romanians^{5} Most in Northern Bukovina and Southern Bessarabia; according to a Moldova Noastră study (based on the latest Ukrainian census).

=== Legal status ===
==== In Romania ====
According to the Constitution of Romania of 1991, as revised in 2003, Romanian is the official language of the Republic.

Romania mandates the use of Romanian in official government publications, public education and legal contracts. Advertisements as well as other public messages must bear a translation of foreign words, while trade signs and logos shall be written predominantly in Romanian.

The Romanian Language Institute (Institutul Limbii Române), established by the Ministry of Education of Romania, promotes Romanian and supports people willing to study the language, working together with the Ministry of Foreign Affairs' Department for Romanians Abroad.

Since 2013, the Romanian Language Day is celebrated on every 31 August.

==== In Moldova ====
Romanian is the official language of the Republic of Moldova. The 1991 Declaration of Independence named the official language Romanian, and the Constitution of Moldova as originally adopted in 1994 named the state language of the country Moldovan. In December 2013, a decision of the Constitutional Court of Moldova ruled that the Declaration of Independence took precedence over the Constitution and the state language should be called Romanian. In 2023, the Moldovan parliament passed a law officially adopting the designation "Romanian" in all legal instruments, implementing the 2013 court decision.

Scholars agree that Moldovan and Romanian are the same language, with the glottonym "Moldovan" used in certain political contexts. It has been the sole official language since the adoption of the Law on State Language of the Moldavian SSR in 1989. This law mandates the use of Moldovan in all the political, economic, cultural and social spheres, as well as asserting the existence of a "linguistic Moldo-Romanian identity". It is also used in schools, mass media, education and in the colloquial speech and writing. Outside the political arena the language is most often called "Romanian". In the breakaway territory of Transnistria, it is co-official with Ukrainian and Russian.

In the 2014 census, out of the 2,804,801 people living in Moldova, 24% (652,394) stated Romanian as their most common language, whereas 56% stated Moldovan. While in the urban centers speakers are split evenly between the two names (with the capital Chișinău showing a strong preference for the name "Romanian", i.e. 3:2), in the countryside hardly a quarter of Romanian/Moldovan speakers indicated Romanian as their native language. Unofficial results of this census first showed a stronger preference for the name Romanian, however the initial reports were later dismissed by the Institute for Statistics, which led to speculations in the media regarding the forgery of the census results.

Of the total population that declared its mother tongue in the 2024 Moldovan census, 49.2% declared Moldovan and 31.3% declared Romanian. The share of the population that declared Romanian as its mother tongue increased by 8.1% compared to the 2014 census (23.2%), and the share that declared Moldovan decreased by 7.8% (56.9% in the 2014 census). The proportion of the population who declared its mother tongue to be Romanian was higher among younger age groups, and it actually predominated in the 20-29 age group (88.785 who declared their "language to be Romanian, and 88,737 who declared it to be Moldovan.

In contrast, regarding the usually spoken language in the 2024 Moldovan census, 46.0% declared it to be Moldovan and 33.2% declared it to be Romanian. The two had together an increase of 0.5% compared to the 2014 census, and there was a significant increase in the share of self-declared speakers of Romanian as their usually spoken language, of 9.5%, as well as a decrease in the share of the self-declared speakers of Moldovan as their usually spoken language, of 9%, compared to the 2014 census. The proportion of the population who declared its usually spoken language to be Romanian was higher among younger age groups for which data is available, and it actually predominated in the 3-29 age group (319,303 who declared their "language to be Romanian, and 289,517 who declared it to be Moldovan).

==== In Serbia ====
===== Vojvodina =====
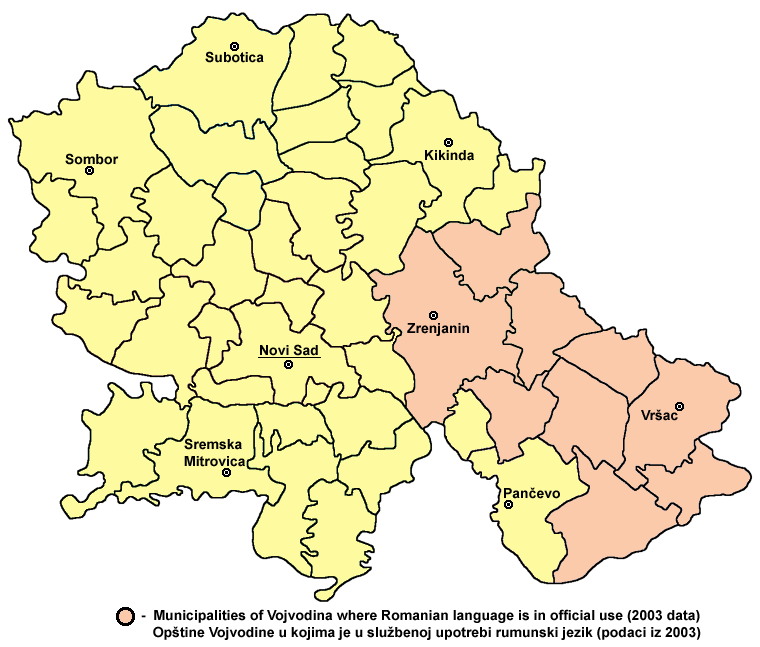
Official usage of Romanian language in Vojvodina, Serbia

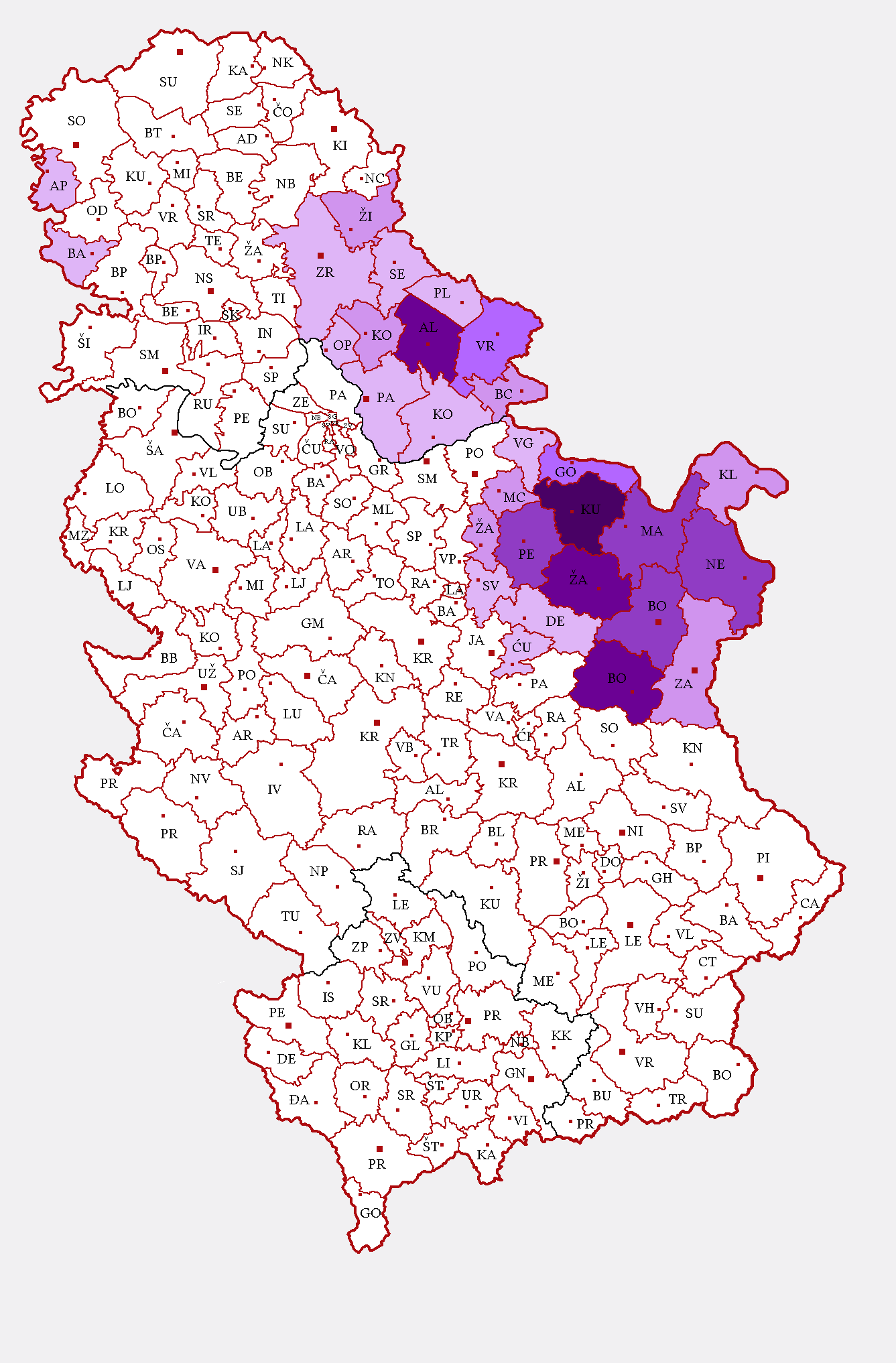
Romanian language in entire Serbia (see also Romanians in Serbia), census 2002: 1–5% 5–10% 10–15% / 15–25% 25–35% over 35%

The Constitution of the Republic of Serbia determines that in the regions of the Republic of Serbia inhabited by national minorities, their own languages and scripts shall be officially used as well, in the manner established by law.

The Statute of the Autonomous Province of Vojvodina determines that, together with the Serbian language and the Cyrillic script, and the Latin script as stipulated by the law, the Croat, Hungarian, Slovak, Romanian and Rusyn languages and their scripts, as well as languages and scripts of other nationalities, shall simultaneously be officially used in the work of the bodies of the Autonomous Province of Vojvodina, in the manner established by the law. The bodies of the Autonomous Province of Vojvodina are: the Assembly, the Executive Council and the provincial administrative bodies.

The Romanian language and script are officially used in eight municipalities: Alibunar, Bela Crkva (Biserica Albă), Žitište (Sângeorgiu de Bega), Zrenjanin (Becicherecu Mare), Kovačica (Covăcița), Kovin (Cuvin), Plandište (Plandiște) and Sečanj (Seceani). In the municipality of Vršac (Vârșeț), Romanian is official only in the villages of Vojvodinci (Voivodinț), Markovac (Marcovăț), Straža (Straja), Mali Žam (Jamu Mic), Malo Središte (Srediștea Mică), Mesić (Mesici), Jablanka (Iablanca), Sočica (Sălcița), Ritiševo (Râtișor), Orešac (Oreșaț) and Kuštilj (Coștei).

In the 2002 Census, the last carried out in Serbia, 1.5% of Vojvodinians stated Romanian as their native language.

===== Timok Valley =====
The Vlachs of Serbia are considered to speak Romanian as well.

==== Regional language status in Ukraine ====
In parts of Ukraine where Romanians constitute a significant share of the local population (districts in Chernivtsi, Odesa and Zakarpattia oblasts) Romanian is taught in schools as a primary language and there are Romanian-language newspapers, TV, and radio broadcasting. The University of Chernivtsi in western Ukraine trains teachers for Romanian schools in the fields of Romanian philology, mathematics and physics.

In Hertsa Raion of Ukraine as well as in other villages of Chernivtsi Oblast and Zakarpattia Oblast, Romanian has been declared a "regional language" alongside Ukrainian as per the 2012 legislation on languages in Ukraine.

==== In other countries and organizations ====
Romanian is an official or administrative language in various communities and organisations, such as the Latin Union and the European Union. Romanian is also one of the five languages in which religious services are performed in the autonomous monastic state of Mount Athos, spoken in the monastic communities of Prodromos and Lakkoskiti. In the unrecognised state of Transnistria, Moldovan is one of the official languages. However, unlike all other dialects of Romanian, this variety of Moldovan is written in Cyrillic script.

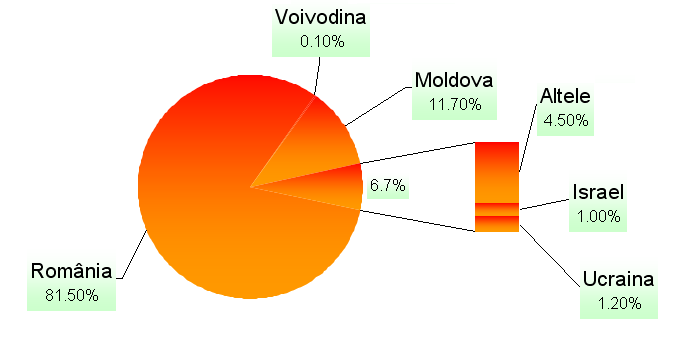
Distribution of first-language native Romanian speakers by country. Voivodina is an autonomous province of northern Serbia bordering Romania, while Altele means "Other"

=== As a second and foreign language ===
Romanian is taught in some areas that have Romanian minority communities, such as Vojvodina in Serbia, Bulgaria, Ukraine and Hungary. The Romanian Cultural Institute (ICR) has since 1992 organised summer courses in Romanian for language teachers. There are also non-Romanians who study Romanian as a foreign language, for example the Nicolae Bălcescu High-school in Gyula, Hungary.

Romanian is taught as a foreign language in tertiary institutions, mostly in European countries such as Germany, France and Italy, and the Netherlands, as well as in the United States. Overall, it is taught as a foreign language in 43 countries around the world.

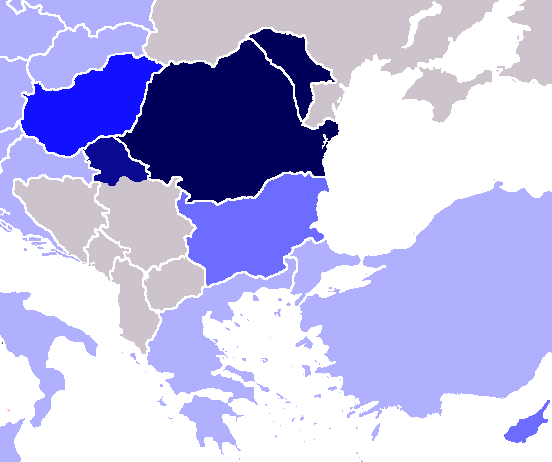
Romanian as secondary or foreign language in Central and Eastern Europe Native Above 3% 1–3% Under 1% N/A

=== Popular culture ===
Romanian has become popular in other countries through movies and songs performed in the Romanian language. Examples of Romanian acts that had a great success in non-Romanophone countries are the bands O-Zone (with their No. 1 single Dragostea Din Tei, also known as Numa Numa, across the world in 2003–2004), Akcent (popular in the Netherlands, Poland and other European countries), Activ (successful in some Eastern European countries), DJ Project (popular as clubbing music) SunStroke Project (known by viral video "Epic Sax Guy") and Alexandra Stan (worldwide no.1 hit with "Mr. Saxobeat") and Inna as well as high-rated movies like 4 Months, 3 Weeks and 2 Days, The Death of Mr. Lazarescu, 12:08 East of Bucharest or California Dreamin' (all of them with awards at the Cannes Film Festival).

Also some artists wrote songs dedicated to the Romanian language. The multi-platinum pop trio O-Zone (originally from Moldova) released a song called "Nu mă las de limba noastră" ("I won't forsake our language"). The final verse of this song, "Eu nu mă las de limba noastră, de limba noastră cea română", is translated in English as "I won't forsake our language, our Romanian language". Also, the Moldovan musicians Doina and Ion Aldea Teodorovici performed a song called "The Romanian language".

=== Dialects ===
Romanian is also called Daco-Romanian in comparative linguistics to distinguish from the other dialects of Common Romanian: Aromanian, Megleno-Romanian, and Istro-Romanian. The origin of the term "Daco-Romanian" can be traced back to the first printed book of Romanian grammar in 1780, by Samuil Micu and Gheorghe Șincai. There, the Romanian dialect spoken north of the Danube is called lingua Daco-Romana to emphasize its origin and its area of use, which includes the former Roman province of Dacia, although it is spoken also south of the Danube, in Dobruja, the Timok Valley and northern Bulgaria.

This article deals with the Romanian (i.e. Daco-Romanian) language, and thus only its dialectal variations are discussed here. The differences between the regional varieties are small, limited to regular phonetic changes, few grammar aspects, and lexical particularities. There is a single written and spoken standard (literary) Romanian language used by all speakers, regardless of region. Like most natural languages, Romanian dialects are part of a dialect continuum. The dialects of Romanian are also referred to as 'sub-dialects' and are distinguished primarily by phonetic differences. Romanians themselves speak of the differences as 'accents' or 'speeches' (in Romanian: accent or grai).

Depending on the criteria used for classifying these dialects, fewer or more are found, ranging from 2 to 20, although the most widespread approaches give a number of five dialects. These are grouped into two main types, southern and northern, further divided as follows:

- The southern type has only one member:
  - the Wallachian dialect, spoken in the southern part of Romania, in the historical regions of Muntenia, Oltenia and the southern part of Northern Dobruja, but also extending in the southern parts of Transylvania.
- The northern type consists of several dialects:
  - the Moldavian dialect, spoken in the historical region of Moldavia, now split among Romania, the Republic of Moldova, and Ukraine (Bukovina, Bessarabia and to the east of Transnistria), as well as northern part of Northern Dobruja;
  - the Banat dialect, spoken in the historical region of Banat, including parts of Serbia;
  - a group of finely divided and transition-like Transylvanian varieties, among which two are most often distinguished, those of Crișana and Maramureș.

Over the last century, however, regional accents have been weakened due to mass communication and greater mobility.

Some argots and speech forms have also arisen from the Romanian language. Examples are the Gumuțeasca, spoken in Mărgău, and the Totoiana, an inverted "version" of Romanian spoken in Totoi.

== Classification ==
=== Romance language ===
Romanian language, as part of the Eastern Romance sub-branch of Romance languages, alongside and related to Aromanian, Megleno-Romanian, and Istro-Romanian. All of these Eastern Romance languages are spoken in Central, Eastern, and Southeastern Europe.

Romanian is a Romance language, belonging to the Italic branch of the Indo-European language family, having much in common with languages such as Italian, Spanish, French and Portuguese.

The closest relative of Romanian among the Romance languages is Italian. The lexical similarity of Romanian with Italian has been estimated at 77%, followed by French at 75%, Sardinian at 74%, Catalan at 73%, Portuguese and Rhaeto-Romance at 72%, and Spanish at 71%.

Compared to some other Romance languages such as Italian, Romanian reflects greater foreign influence in areas such as vocabulary. The Romanian vocabulary became predominantly influenced by French and, to a lesser extent, Italian in the nineteenth and early twentieth centuries.

A 1949 study by the Italian-American linguist Mario Pei, analyzing the degree to which seven Romance languages diverged from Classical Latin with respect to their accent vocalization, yielded the following measurements of divergence (with higher percentages indicating greater divergence from the stressed vowels of Classical Latin):

- Logudorese Sardinian: 8%
- Italian: 12%
- Spanish: 20%
- Romanian: 23.5%
- Occitan: 25%
- Portuguese: 31%
- French: 44%

The study emphasized, however, that it represented only "a very elementary, incomplete and tentative demonstration" of how statistical methods could measure linguistic change, assigned "frankly arbitrary" point values to various types of change, and did not compare languages in the sample with respect to any characteristics or forms of divergence other than stressed vowels, among other caveats.

=== Balkan language area ===
While most of Romanian grammar and morphology are based on Latin, there are some features that are shared only with other languages of the Balkans and not found in other Romance languages. The shared features of Romanian and the other languages of the Balkan language area (Bulgarian, Macedonian, Albanian, Greek, and Serbo-Croatian) include a suffixed definite article, the syncretism of genitive and dative case and the formation of the future and the alternation of infinitive with subjunctive constructions. According to a well-established scholarly theory, most Balkanisms could be traced back to the development of the Balkan Romance languages; these features were adopted by other languages due to language shift.

=== Slavic influence ===
Slavic influence on Romanian is especially noticeable in its vocabulary, with words of Slavic origin constituting about 10–15% of modern Romanian lexicon, and with further influences in its phonetics, morphology and syntax. The greater part of its Slavic vocabulary comes from Old Church Slavonic, which was the official written language of Wallachia and Moldavia from the 14th to the 18th century (although not understood by most people), as well as the liturgical language of the Romanian Orthodox Church. As a result, much Romanian vocabulary dealing with religion, ritual, and hierarchy is Slavic. The number of high-frequency Slavic-derived words is also believed to indicate contact or cohabitation with South Slavic tribes from around the 6th century, though it is disputed where this took place (see Origin of the Romanians). Words borrowed in this way tend to be more vernacular (compare sfârși, "to end", with săvârși, "to commit"). It has also been argued that Slavic borrowing was a key factor in the development of [ɨ] (î and â) as a separate phoneme.

=== Other influences ===
Even before the 19th century, Romanian came in contact with several other languages. Notable examples of lexical borrowings include:

- German: cartof < Kartoffel "potato", bere < Bier "beer", șurub < Schraube "screw", turn < Turm "tower", ramă < Rahmen "frame", muștiuc < Mundstück "mouth piece", bormașină < Bohrmaschine "drilling machine", cremșnit < Kremschnitte "cream slice", șvaițer < Schweizer "Swiss cheese", șlep < Schleppkahn "barge", șpriț < Spritzer "wine with soda water", abțibild < Abziehbild "decal picture", șnițel < (Wiener) Schnitzel "a battered cutlet", șmecher < Schmecker "taster (not interested in buying)", șuncă < dialectal Schunke (Schinken) "ham", punct < Punkt "point", maistru < Meister "master", rundă < Runde "round".

Furthermore, during the Habsburg and, later on, Austrian rule of Banat, Transylvania, and Bukovina, a large number of words were borrowed from Austrian High German, in particular in fields such as the military, administration, social welfare, economy, etc. Subsequently, German terms have been taken out of science and technics, like: șină < Schiene "rail", știft < Stift "peg", liță < Litze "braid", șindrilă < Schindel "shingle", ștanță < Stanze "punch", șaibă < Scheibe "washer", ștangă < Stange "crossbar", țiglă < Ziegel "tile", șmirghel < Schmirgelpapier "emery paper";

- Greek: folos < ófelos "use", buzunar < buzunára "pocket", proaspăt < prósfatos "fresh", cutie < cution "box", portocale < portokalia "oranges". While Latin borrowed words of Greek origin, Romanian obtained Greek loanwords on its own. Greek entered Romanian through the apoikiai (colonies) and emporia (trade stations) founded in and around Dobruja, through the presence of Byzantine Empire in north of the Danube, through Bulgarian during Bulgarian Empires that converted Romanians to Orthodox Christianity, and after the Greek Civil War, when thousands of Greeks fled Greece.
- Hungarian: a cheltui < költeni "to spend", a făgădui < fogadni "to promise", a mântui < menteni "to save", oraș < város "city";
- Turkish: papuc < pabuç "slipper", ciorbă < çorba "wholemeal soup, sour soup", bacșiș < bahşiş "tip" (ultimately from Persian baksheesh);
- Additionally, the Romani language has provided a series of slang words to Romanian such as: mișto "good, beautiful, cool" < mišto, gagică "girlie, girlfriend" < gadji, a hali "to devour" < halo, mandea "yours truly" < mande, a mangli "to pilfer" < manglo.

=== French, Italian, and English loanwords ===
Since the 19th century, many literary or learned words were borrowed from the other Romance languages, especially from French and Italian (for example: birou "desk, office", avion "airplane", exploata "exploit"). It was estimated that about 38% of words in Romanian are of French and/or Italian origin (in many cases both languages); and adding this to Romanian's native stock, about 75%–85% of Romanian words can be traced to Latin. The use of these Romanianized French and Italian learned loans has tended to increase at the expense of previous loanwords, many of which have become rare or fallen out of use. As second or third languages, French and Italian themselves are better known in Romania than in Romania's neighbors. Along with the switch to the Latin alphabet in Moldova, the re-latinization of the vocabulary has tended to reinforce the Latin character of the language.

In the process of lexical modernization, much of the native Latin stock have acquired doublets from other Romance languages, thus forming a further and more modern and literary lexical layer. Typically, the native word is a noun and the learned loan is an adjective. Some examples of doublets:

Latin and native doublets in Romanian
Latin	Native stock	Learned loan
agilis 'quick’	ager 'astute’	agil 'agile' (< French, Italian agile)
aqua	apă 'water’	acvatic 'aquatic' (< Fr aquatique)
dens, dentem	dinte 'tooth’	dentist 'dentist' (< Fr dentiste, It dentista)
directus	drept 'straight; right’	direct 'direct' (< Fr direct)
frigidus 'cold' (adj.)	frig 'cold' (noun)	frigid 'frigid' (< Fr frigide)
rapidus	repede 'quick’	rapid 'quick' (< Fr rapide, It rapido)

In the 20th century, an increasing number of English words have been borrowed (such as: gem < jam; interviu < interview; meci < match; manager < manager; fotbal < football; sandvici/sendviș < sandwich; bișniță < business; chec < cake; veceu < WC; tramvai < tramway). These words are assigned grammatical gender in Romanian and handled according to Romanian rules; thus "the manager" is managerul. Some borrowings, for example in the computer field, appear to have awkward (perhaps contrived and ludicrous) 'Romanisation,' such as cookie-uri which is the plural of the Internet term cookie; normally, the hyphen isn't used for plural endings and definite articles.

In some cases, there are multiple variants of loanwords, such as maus/mauși (masculine) and mouse/mouse-uri (neuter).

=== Lexis ===
Romanian's core lexicon (2,581 words); Marius Sala, VRLR (1988)

A 1988 statistic by Marius Sala is based on 2,581 words chosen on the criteria of frequency, semantic richness and productivity, which also contain words formed on the territory of the Romanian language. This statistic gives the percentages below:

- 30.33% – words inherited from Latin;
- 15.26% – academic loanwords from Latin;
- 22.12% – French loans;
- 9.18% – loans from Old Church Slavonic;
- 3.95% – loans from Italian;
- 3.91% – words formed in Romanian;
- 2.71% – words of uncertain origin;
- 2.6% – loans from Bulgarian;
- 2.47% – loans from German (including Austrian High German);
- 1.7% – loans from Greek;
- 1.43% – loans from Hungarian;
- 1.12% – loans from Russian;
- 0.96% – words inherited from the Thraco-Dacian substratum;
- 0.85% – loans from Serbian;
- 0.73% – loans from Turkish

If the analysis is restricted to a core vocabulary of 2,500 frequent, semantically rich and productive words, then the Latin inheritance comes first, followed by Romance and classical Latin neologisms, whereas the Slavic borrowings come third.

Romanian according to word origin
Romance and Latin	78%
Slavic	14%
Germanic (Note: German-based influence and English loanwords)	2.54%
Greek	1.7%
Others	5.49%

Although they are rarely used nowadays, the Romanian calendar used to have the traditional Romanian month names, unique to the language.

The longest word in Romanian is pneumonoultramicroscopicsilicovolcaniconioză, with 44 letters, but the longest one admitted by the Dicționarul explicativ al limbii române ("Explanatory Dictionary of the Romanian Language", DEX) is electroglotospectrografie, with 25 letters.

== Grammar ==
Romanian grammar is often known as the most difficult of the major Romance languages due to its case system, enclitic articles, neuter gender, and foreign vocabulary.

Romanian nouns are characterized by gender (feminine, masculine, and neuter), and declined by number (singular and plural) and case (nominative/accusative, dative/genitive and vocative). Romanian is the only major Romance language to have kept its case system from Latin. The articles, as well as most adjectives and pronouns, agree in gender, number and case with the noun they modify.

Romanian is also the only major Romance language where definite articles are enclitic: that is, attached to the end of the noun (as in the Scandinavian languages, Bulgarian and Albanian), instead of in front (proclitic), due to the Balkan Sprachbund. They were formed, as in other Romance languages, from the Latin demonstrative pronouns.

As in all Romance languages, Romanian verbs are highly inflected for person, number, tense, mood, and voice. The usual word order in sentences is subject–verb–object (SVO). Romanian has four verbal conjugations which further split into ten conjugation patterns. Romanian verbs are conjugated for five moods (indicative, conditional/optative, imperative, subjunctive, and presumptive) and four non-finite forms (infinitive, gerund, supine, and participle).

== Phonology ==
Romanian has seven vowels: /i/, /ɨ/, /u/, /e/, /ə/, /o/ and /a/. Additionally, /ø/ and /y/ may appear in some borrowed words. Arguably, the diphthongs /e̯a/ and /o̯a/ are also part of the phoneme set. There are twenty-two consonants. The two approximants /j/ and /w/ can appear before or after any vowel, creating a large number of glide-vowel sequences which are, strictly speaking, not diphthongs.

In final positions after consonants, a short /i/ can be deleted, surfacing only as the palatalization of the preceding consonant (e.g., [mʲ]). Similarly, a deleted /u/ may prompt labialization of a preceding consonant, though this has ceased to carry any morphological weight.

=== Phonetic changes ===
Owing to its isolation from the other Romance languages, the phonetic evolution of Romanian was quite different, but the language does share a few changes with Italian, such as [kl] → [kj] (Lat. clarus → Rom. chiàr, Ital. chiaro, Lat. clamare → Rom. chemare, Ital. chiamare) and [ɡl] → [ɡj] (Lat. *glacia (glacies) → Rom. ghéață, Ital. ghiaccia, ghiaccio, Lat. *ungla (ungula) → Rom. unghie, Ital. unghia), although this did not go as far as it did in Italian with other similar clusters (Rom. plàce, Ital. piace).

Another similarity with Italian is the change from [ke] or [ki] to [tʃe] or [tʃi] (Lat. pax, pacem → Rom. and Ital. pace, Lat. dulcem → Rom. dulce, Ital. dolce, Lat. circus → Rom. cerc, Ital. circo) and [ɡe] or [ɡi] to [dʒe] or [dʒi] (Lat. gelu → Rom. gèr, Ital. gelo, Lat. marginem → Rom. and Ital. margine, Lat. gemere → Rom. gèm (gemere), Ital. gemere).

There are also a few changes shared with Dalmatian, such as /ɡn/ (probably phonetically [ŋn]) → [mn] (Lat. cognatus → Rom. cumnat, Dalm. comnut) and /ks/ → [ps] in some situations (Lat. coxa → Rom. cópsă, Dalm. copsa).

Among the notable phonetic changes are:

- diphthongization of e and o → ea and oa, before ă (or e as well, in the case of o) in the next syllable:

- Lat. cera → Rom. céră (wax)
- Lat. sole → Rom. sóre (sun)

- iotation [e] → [ie] in the beginning of the word

- Lat. herba → Rom. ĭarbă (grass, herb)

- velar [k ɡ] → labial [p b m] before alveolar consonants and [w] (e.g. ngu → mb):

- Lat. octo → Rom. opt (eight)
- Lat. lingua → Rom. lìmbă (tongue, language)
- Lat. signum → Rom. sèmn (sign)
- Lat. coxa → Rom. cópsă (thigh)
- Lat. aqua → Rom. apă (water)

- rhotacism [l] → [r] between vowels

- Lat. caelum → Rom. cèr (sky)

- Alveolars [d t] assibilated to [(d)z] [(t)s] when before short [e] or long [iː]

- Lat. deus → Rom. ḑèŭ → zèŭ (god)
- Lat. tenem → Rom. ține (hold)

Romanian has entirely lost Latin /kw/ (qu), turning it either into /p/ (Lat. quattuor → Rom. pàtru, "four"; cf. It. quattro) or /k/ (Lat. quando → Rom. când, "when"; Lat. quale → Rom. càre, "which").

== Writing system ==
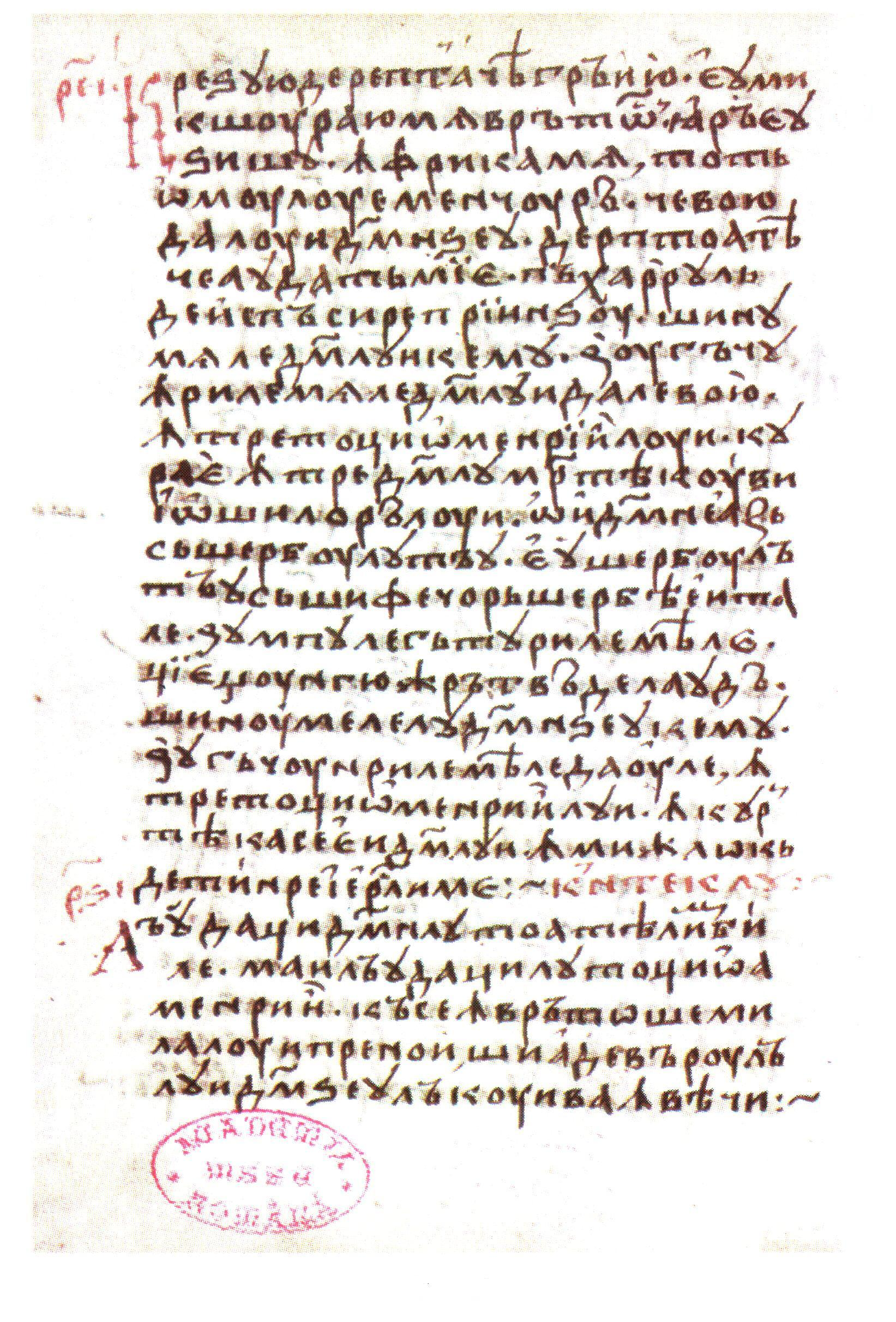
Hurmuzaki Psalter, dated between 1491 and 1504.

The first written record about a Romance language spoken in the Middle Ages in the Balkans is from 587. A Vlach muleteer accompanying the Byzantine army noticed that the load was falling from one of the animals and shouted to a companion Torna, torna, fratre! (meaning "Return, return, brother!"). Theophanes Confessor recorded it as part of a 6th-century military expedition by Comentiolus and Priscus against the Avars and Slovenes.

The oldest surviving written text in Romanian is a letter from late June 1521, in which Neacșu of Câmpulung wrote to the mayor of Brașov about an imminent attack of the Turks. It was written using the Cyrillic alphabet, like most early Romanian writings. The earliest surviving writing in Latin script was a late 16th-century Transylvanian text which was written with the Hungarian alphabet conventions.

In the 18th century, Transylvanian scholars noted the Latin origin of Romanian and adapted the Latin alphabet to the Romanian language, using some orthographic rules from Italian, recognized as Romanian's closest relative. The Cyrillic alphabet remained in (gradually decreasing) use until 1860, when Romanian writing was first officially regulated.

In the Soviet Republic of Moldova, the Russian-derived Moldovan Cyrillic alphabet was used until 1989, when the Romanian Latin alphabet was introduced; in the breakaway territory of Transnistria the Cyrillic alphabet remains in use.

=== Romanian alphabet ===
The Romanian alphabet is as follows:

Capital letters
A	Ă	Â	B	C	D	E	F	G	H	I	Î	J	K	L	M	N	O	P	Q	R	S	Ș	T	Ț	U	V	W	X	Y	Z
Lower case letters
a	ă	â	b	c	d	e	f	g	h	i	î	j	k	l	m	n	o	p	q	r	s	ș	t	ț	u	v	w	x	y	z
Phonemes
/a/	/ə/	/ɨ/	/b/	/k/, /t͡ʃ/	/d/	/e/, /e̯/, /je/	/f/	/ɡ/, /d͡ʒ/	/h/, mute	/i/, /j/, /ʲ/	/ɨ/	/ʒ/	/k/	/l/	/m/	/n/	/o/, /o̯/	/p/	/k/	/r/	/s/	/ʃ/	/t/	/t͡s/	/u/, /w/	/v/	/v/, /w/, /u/	/ks/, /ɡz/	/j/, /i/	/z/

K, Q, W and Y, are not part of the native alphabet; they were officially introduced in the Romanian alphabet in 1982 and are mostly used to write loanwords like kilogram, quasar, watt, and yoga.

The Romanian alphabet is based on the Latin script with five additional letters Ă, Â, Î, Ș, Ț. Formerly, there were as many as 12 additional letters, but some of them were abolished in subsequent reforms. Also, until the early 20th century, a breve marker was used, which survives only in ă.

Today the Romanian alphabet is largely phonemic. However, the letters â and î both represent the same close central unrounded vowel /ɨ/. Â is used only inside words; î is used at the beginning or the end of non-compound words and in the middle of compound words. Another exception from a completely phonetic writing system is the fact that vowels and their respective semivowels are not distinguished in writing. In dictionaries the distinction is marked by separating the entry word into syllables for words containing a hiatus.

Stressed vowels also are not marked in writing, except very rarely in cases where by misplacing the stress a word might change its meaning and if the meaning is not obvious from the context. For example, trei copíi means "three children" while trei cópii means "three copies".

=== Pronunciation ===
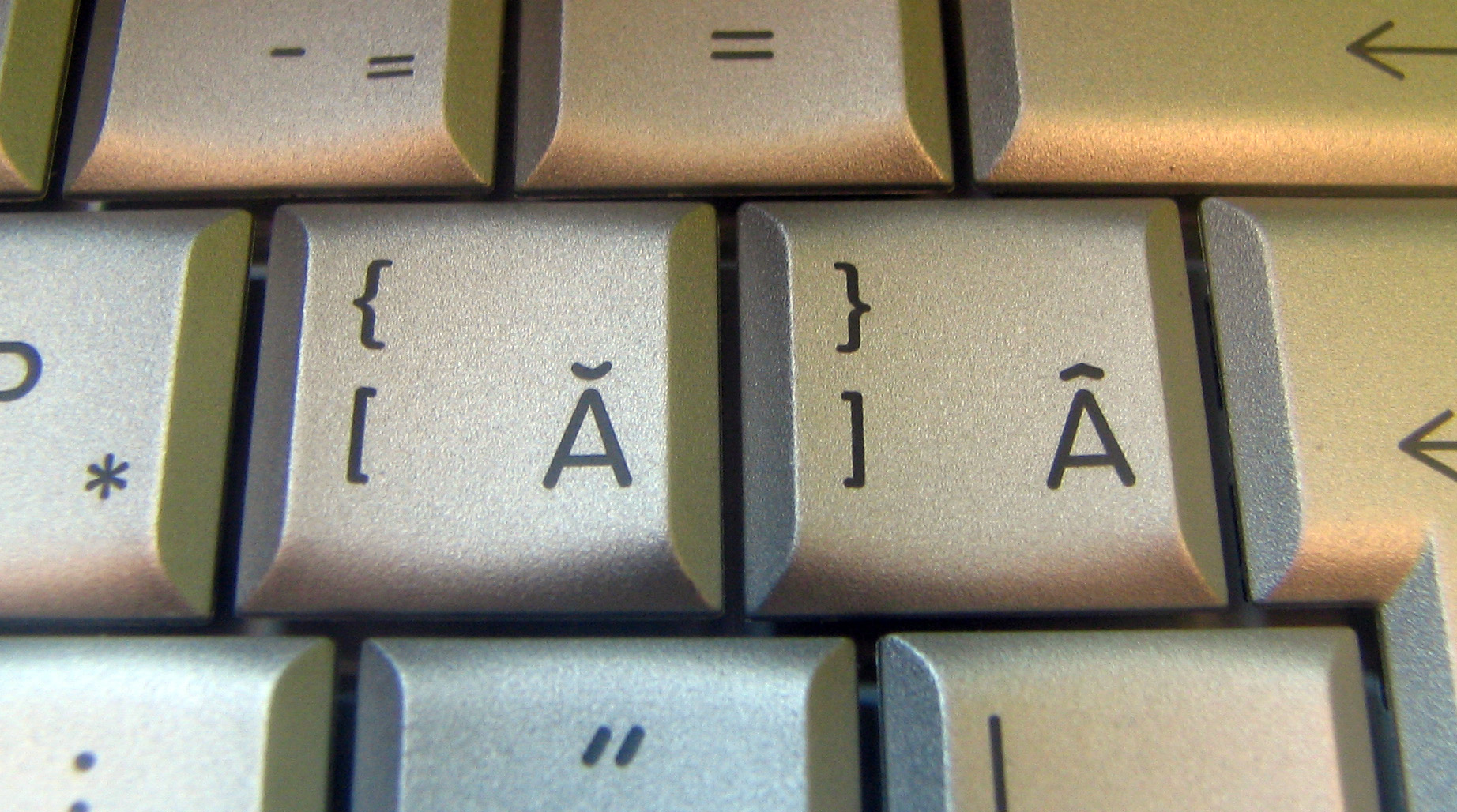
A close shot of some keys with Romanian characters on the keyboard of a laptop

- h is not silent like in other Romance languages such as Spanish, Italian, Portuguese, Catalan and French, but represents the phoneme /h/, except in the digraphs ch /k/ and gh /g/ (see below)
- j represents /ʒ/, as in French, Catalan or Portuguese (the sound spelled with s in the English words "vision, pleasure, treasure").
- There are two letters with a comma below, Ș and Ț, which represent the sounds /ʃ/ and /t͡s/. However, the allographs with a cedilla instead of a comma, Ş and Ţ, became widespread when pre-Unicode and early Unicode character sets did not include the standard form.
- ă represents the schwa, /ə/.
- î and â both represent the sound /ɨ/. In rapid speech (for example in the name of the country) the â sound may sound similar to a casual listener to the short schwa sound ă (in fact, Aromanian does merge the two, writing them ã) but careful speakers will distinguish the sound. The nearest equivalent is the vowel in the last syllable of the word roses for some English dialects which distinguish it from Rosa's (e.g. /ˈroʊzɪz/ vs /ˈroʊzəz/). It is also roughly equivalent to European Portuguese /ɨ/, the Polish y or the Russian ы.
- The letter e generally represents the mid front unrounded vowel [e], somewhat like in the English word set. However, the letter e is pronounced as [je] ([j] sounds like 'y' in 'you') when it is the first letter of any form of the verb a fi "to be", or of a personal pronoun, for instance este /jeste/ "is" and el /jel/ "he". This addition of the semivowel /j/ does not occur in more recent loans and their derivatives, such as eră "era", electric "electric" etc. Some words (such as iepure "hare", formerly spelled epure) are now written with the initial i to indicate the semivowel.
- x represents either the phoneme sequence /ks/ as in expresie = expression, or /ɡz/ as in exemplu = example, as in English.
- As in Italian, the letters c and g represent the affricates /tʃ/ and /dʒ/ before i and e, and /k/ and /ɡ/ elsewhere. When /k/ and /ɡ/ are followed by vowels /e/ and /i/ (or their corresponding semivowels or the final /ʲ/) the digraphs ch and gh are used instead of c and g, as shown in the table below. Unlike Italian, however, Romanian uses ce- and ge- to write /t͡ʃ/ and /d͡ʒ/ before a central vowel instead of ci- and gi-.

Group	Phoneme	Pronunciation	Examples
ce, ci	/tʃ/	ch in chest, cheek	cerc (circle), ceașcă (cup), cercel (earring), cină (dinner), ciocan (hammer)
che, chi	/k/	k in kettle, kiss	cheie (key), chelner (waiter), chioșc (kiosk), chitară (guitar), ureche (ear)
ge, gi	/dʒ/	j in jelly, jigsaw	ger (frost), gimnast (gymnast), gem (jam), girafă (giraffe), geantă (bag)
ghe, ghi	/ɡ/	g in get, give	ghețar (glacier), ghid (guide), ghindă (acorn), ghidon (handle bar), stingher (lonely)

=== Punctuation and capitalization ===
Uses of punctuation peculiar to Romanian are:

- Quotation marks use one of the Polish quotation formats, specifically „quote «inside» quote”, that is, „…” for a normal quotation, and «…» for a quotation inside a quotation.
- Proper quotations which span multiple paragraphs do not start each paragraph with quotation marks; quotation marks are placed only at the beginning and the end of the entire quotation, regardless of how many paragraphs it contains.
- Dialogues use quotation dashes.
- The Oxford comma before "and" is considered incorrect ("red, yellow and blue" is the proper format).
- Punctuation signs which follow a text in parentheses always follow the final bracket.
- In titles, only the first letter of the first word is capitalized, the rest of the title using sentence capitalization (with all its rules: proper names are capitalized as usual, etc.).
- Names of months and days are not capitalized (ianuarie "January", joi "Thursday").
- Adjectives derived from proper names are not capitalized (Germania "Germany", but german "German").

=== Academy spelling recommendations ===
In 1993, new spelling rules were proposed by the Romanian Academy. In 2000, the Moldovan Academy recommended adopting the same spelling rules, and in 2010 the Academy launched a schedule for the transition to the new rules that was intended to be completed by publications in 2011.

On 17 October 2016, the Moldovan minister of education signed Order No. 872, adopting the revised spelling rules as recommended by the Moldovan Academy of Sciences, and giving the following two school years as a transition period. Thus the spelling used by institutions under Moldova's ministry of education has been brought in line with the Romanian Academy's 1993 recommendation. This order, however, did not apply to other government institutions, and Law 3462 of 1989 (which provided for the means of transliterating Cyrillic to Latin) has not been amended to reflect the ministry of education's changes either; thus, most Moldovan government institutions, along with most Moldovans, prefer to use the spelling adopted in 1989 (when the use of Latin script became official).

=== Examples of Romanian text ===
All human beings are born free and equal in dignity and rights. They are endowed with reason and conscience and should act towards one another in a spirit of brotherhood.

(Universal Declaration of Human Rights)

The sentence in contemporary Romanian. Words inherited directly from Latin are highlighted:

Toate ființele umane se nasc libere și egale în demnitate și în drepturi. Ele sunt înzestrate cu rațiune și conștiință și trebuie să se comporte unele față de altele în spiritul fraternității.

The same sentence, with French and Italian loanwords highlighted instead:

Toate ființele umane se nasc libere și egale în demnitate și în drepturi. Ele sunt înzestrate cu rațiune și conștiință și trebuie să se comporte unele față de altele în spiritul fraternității.

The sentence rewritten to exclude French and Italian loanwords. Slavic loanwords are highlighted:

Toate ființele omenești se nasc slobode și deopotrivă în destoinicie și în drepturi. Ele sunt înzestrate cu înțelegere și cuget și trebuie să se poarte unele față de altele în duh de frățietate.

The sentence rewritten to exclude all loanwords. The meaning is unchanged:

Toate ființele omenești se nasc nesupuse și asemenea în prețuire și în drepturi. Ele sunt înzestrate cu înțelegere și cuget și se cuvine să se poarte unele față de altele frățește.

== See also ==
- Controversy over ethnic and linguistic identity in Moldova
- Eastern Romance languages
- Eastern Romance substratum
- Legacy of the Roman Empire
- Moldova–Romania relations
- Moldovan language
- Neacșu's letter
- Romanian Cyrillic alphabet
- Romanian dialects
- Romanian grammar
- Romanian lexis
- Romanian literature
- Romanian phonology
- Romanian transitional alphabet
- Tărtăria tablets

== Bibliography ==
- Andreose, Alvise; Renzi, Lorenzo (2013). "Geography and Distribution of the Romance Languages in Europe". In Maiden, Martin; Smith, John Charles; Ledgeway, Adam (eds.). The Cambridge History of the Romance Languages. Vol. 2: Contexts. Cambridge: Cambridge University Press. pp. 283–334. ISBN 978-0-521-80073-0.
- Giurescu, Constantin C. (1972). The Making of the Romanian People and Language. Bucharest: Meridiane.
- Kahl, Thede, ed. (2009). Das Rumänische und seine Nachbarn (in German). Berlin: Frank & Timme.
- Paliga, Sorin (2010). "When Could Be Dated the 'Earliest Slavic Borrowings in Romanian'?" (PDF). Romanoslavica. 46 (4): 101–119. Archived (PDF) from the original on 27 June 2019.
- Petrucci, Peter R. (1999). Slavic Features in the History of Rumanian. München: LINCOM Europa. ISBN 38-9586-599-0.
- Rosetti, Alexandru (1965–1969). Istoria limbii române (in Romanian). Vol. 1–2. București: Editura științifică.
- Hinrichs, Uwe, ed. (1999). Handbuch der Südosteuropa-Linguistik (in German). Wiesbaden: Harrassowitz Verlag.
