= Neacșu's letter =

16th century Romanian-language warning letter

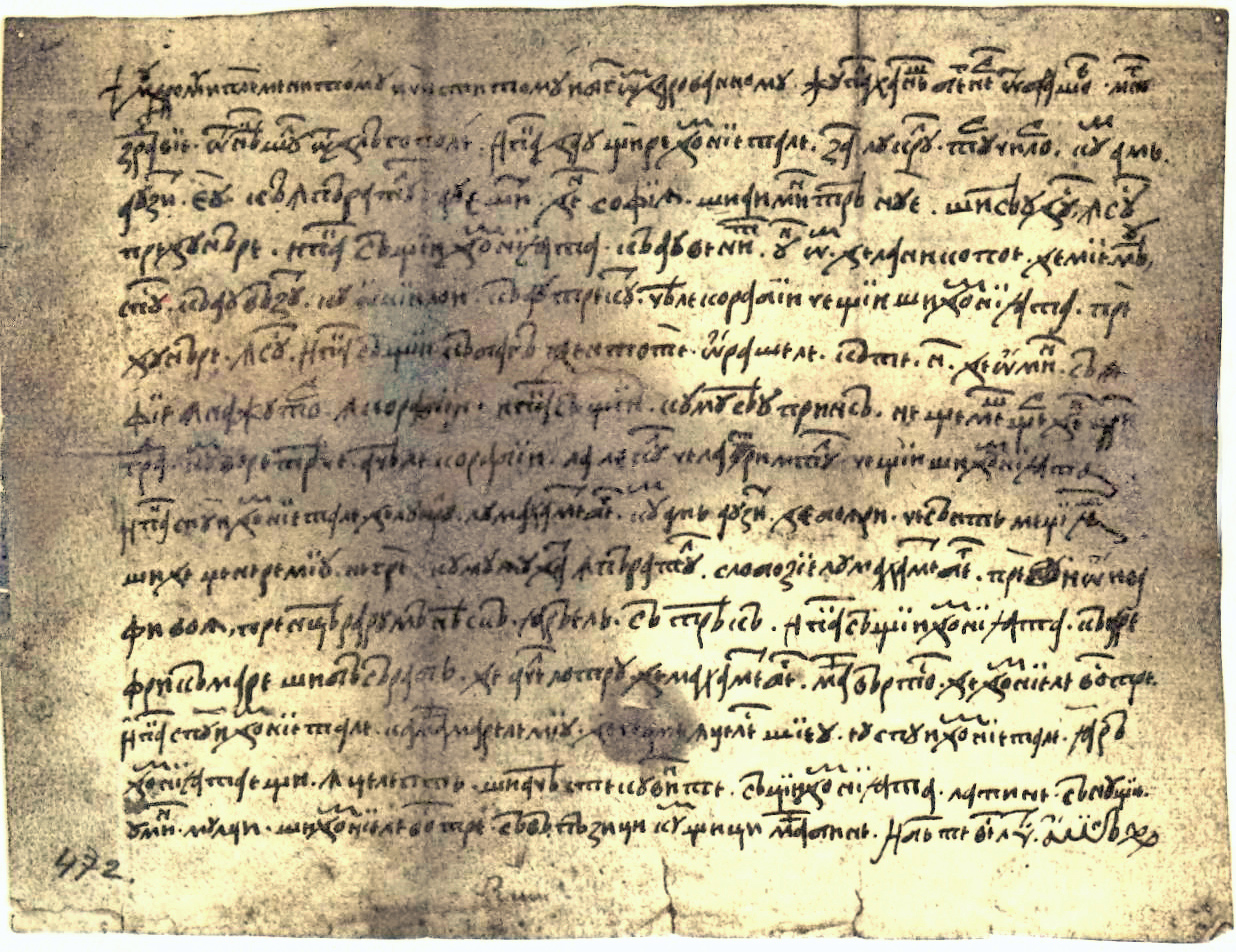
Neacșu's letter is the oldest surviving document written in Old Romanian that can be precisely dated

Neacșu's letter (Romanian: Scrisoarea lui Neacșu), written in 1521, is the oldest surviving document available in Old Romanian that can be precisely dated. Written using Cyrillic, it was sent by Lupu Neacșu, a merchant from Câmpulung, Wallachia (now Romania) to Johannes Benkner, the mayor of Brassó, Kingdom of Hungary (now Brașov, Romania), warning him about the imminent attack of the Ottoman Empire on the city of Belgrad and its implications to regional politics.

Lupu Neacșu was the son of Mircea Neacșu, mentioned for the first time during Vlad cel Tânăr's reign (1510–1512), in documents related to a trial regarding debts between himself and merchants of Brașov. It is possible that he was himself a merchant involved in the trade of Turkish goods that he was buying south of the Danube and selling in Transylvania, which may explain his relationship with the mayor of Brașov. The letter is kept in the collections of the National Archives in Brașov.

For a long time this document was considered the oldest text written in Romanian. In recent decades it has been proven, on the basis of watermarks, that the Hurmuzaki Psalter is the oldest Romanian text, being written sometime between 1491-1504. Neacșu's letter remains the oldest precisely dated Romanian document.

== History ==
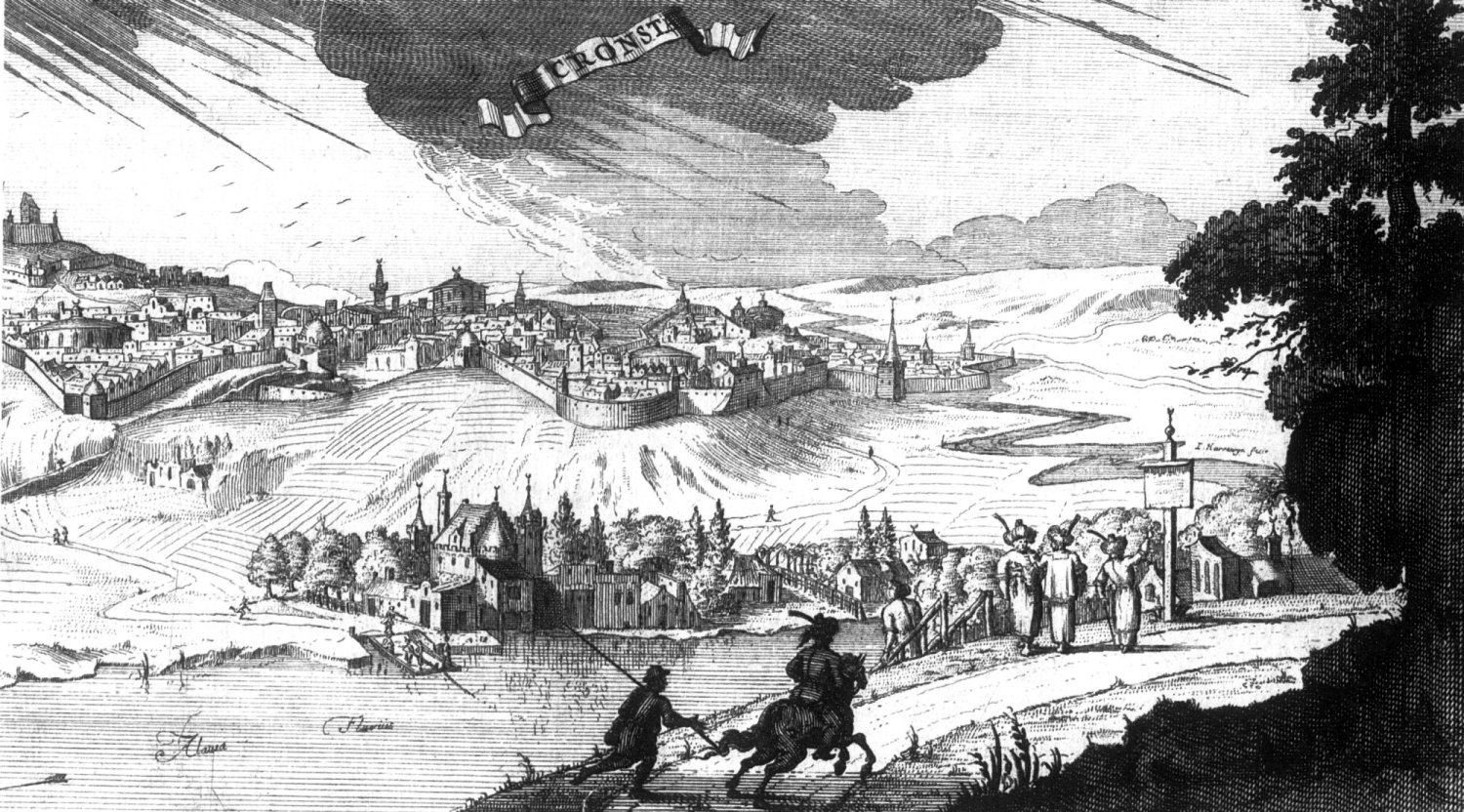
Early engraving of Brașov

The letter of Neacșu of Câmpulung to Johannes (Hans) Benkner of Brașov was most probably written on June 29 or 30, 1521, in the city of Dlăgopole (Old Bulgarian rendition/translation of Câmpulung, lit. "the long field"). The date is not mentioned within the letter itself, it being inferred from the historic events described and the people mentioned.

The letter was discovered in 1894 by Wilhelm Stenner, the archivar of Brașov.

== Contents ==
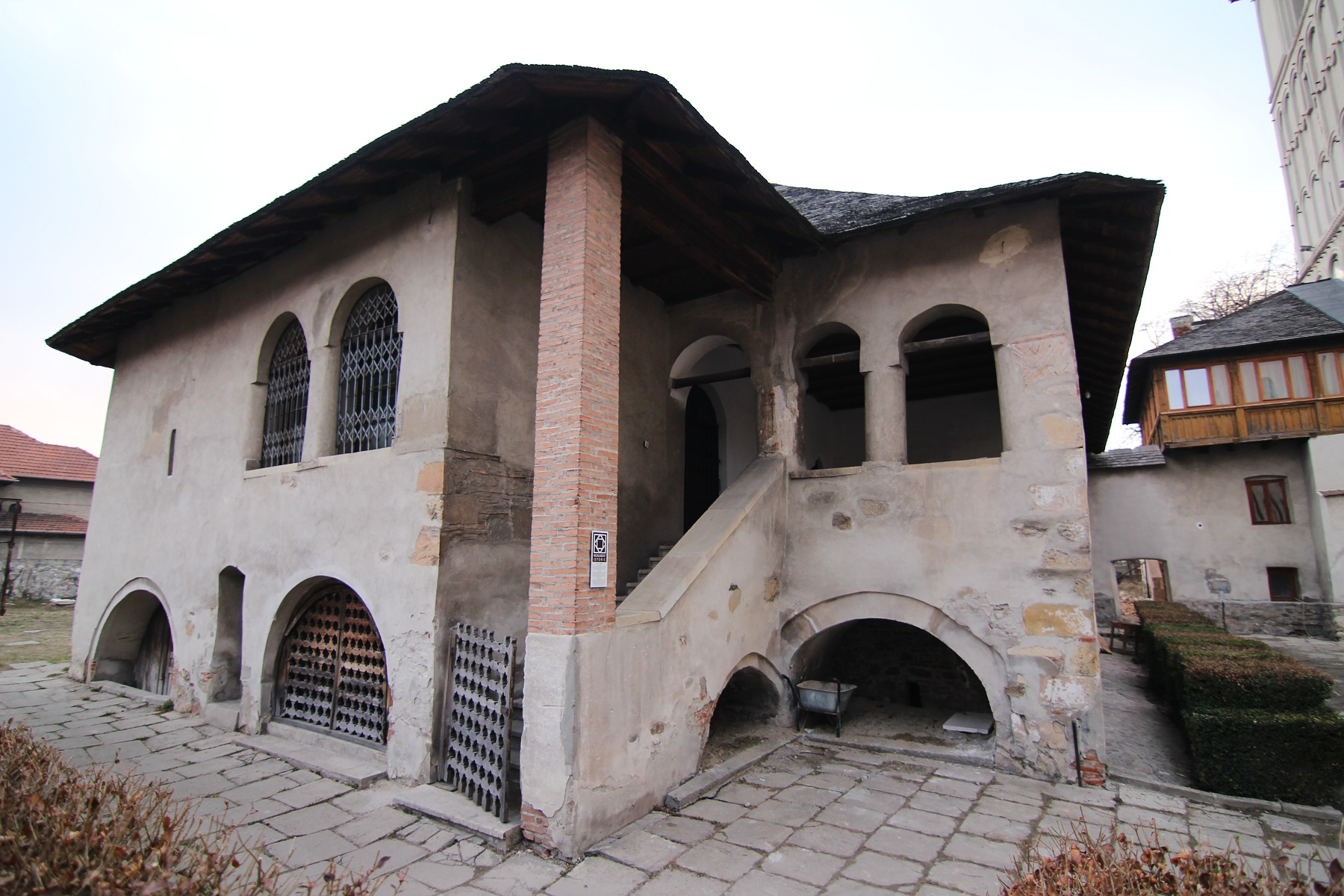
Boyar house in Câmpulung

The text of the letter was written in the Cyrillic script, and is composed of three parts. The introduction in Old Church Slavonic, translated: "To the most wise and noble and venerable and by God endowed master Hanas Begner of Brașov, all the best, from Neacșu of Câmpulung".

Following the Slavonic introduction, the content of the letter is written in the old Romanian language. As opposed to the first documents of other languages, which are in general more ancient, the Romanian language used in this letter is very similar to the language spoken in the present day. The Romanian linguist Aurel Nicolescu stated that no less than 175 words of the 190 found in the letter have Latin origins, this not counting the repeated words and the names. Some incorrect forms of different words appear due to the difficulty of representing some Romanian sounds like ă and î, while using the Cyrillic alphabet.

Lupu Neacșu's letter contained a secret of great importance, warning Johannes Benkner of Brașov about Turkish preparations for an invasion through Transylvania and Wallachia.

Another two Slavonic expressions are also present throughout the content of the letter: "I pak", meaning "and again" and having a similar function as the Latin "item", being also used to mark the beginning of a new sentence, and also the word "za", meaning about.

The letter ends with another sentence written in Bulgarian, which means: "And may God bring happiness upon you. Amen."

== Text ==
=== Transliteration from Cyrillic ===
1. m^{u}drom^{u} i plemenitom^{u} i čistitom^{u} i b(o)gω^{m} darovannom^{u} župa^{n} hanĭ^{š} be^{g}ne^{r} o^{t} brašo^{v} mno^{g}(o)
2. z^{d}ravie o^{t} ně^{k}šu^{l} o^{t} dlŭgopole i pa^{k} dau štire do^{m}nïetale za lukru^{l} tu^{r}čilo^{r} kum amĭ
3. auzi^{t} èu kŭ ĩpŭratu^{l} au èši^{t} de^{n} sofïę ši aimi^{n}trě nue ši sěu du^{s} ĩ su^{s}
4. pre dunŭre i pa^{k} sŭ štïi do^{m}nïjata kŭ au veni^{t} u^{n} ω^{m} de la nikopoe de mïe mě^{u}
5. spu^{s} kŭ au vŭzu^{t} ku ωkïi loi kŭ au treku^{t} čěle korabïi če štïi ši do^{m} nïjata prè
6. dunŭre ĩ su^{s} i pak sŭ štïi kŭ bagŭ den tote ωrašele kŭte 50 de ωmi^{n} sŭ ę
7. fïe ĩn ažuto^{r} ĩ korabïi i pak sŭ štïi kumu sěu prinsŭ nešte me^{š}šte^{r} de^{n} c(a)ri
8. gra^{d} ku^{m} vorĭ trěče ačěle korabïi la loku^{l} čela strimtu^{l} če štïi ši do^{m}nïjata
9. i pa^{k} spui do^{m}nïetale de lukru^{l} lu mahame^{t} be^{g} ku^{m}u amĭ auzit de boęri če sŭntĭ medžïja^{š}
10. ši de dženere mïu negre kumu ęu da^{t} ĩpŭratu^{l} slobozïe lu mahame^{t} beg pre iu iωi va
11. fi voę pren cěra rumŭněskŭ jarŭ èlĭ sŭ trěkŭ i pa^{k} sŭ štïi do^{m}nïjata kŭ are
12. frikŭ mare ši bŭsŭrab de ače^{l} lotru de mahame^{t} be^{g} ma^{i} vŭrto^{s} de do^{m}nïele vo^{s}tre
13. i pa^{k} spui do^{m}nïetale ka ma^{i} marele mïu de če amĭ ĩcele^{s} šïeu eu spui do^{m}nïetale jarŭ
14. do^{m}nïjata ešti ĩceleptĭ ši ačěste kuvi^{n}te sŭ cïi do^{m}nïjata la tine sŭ nu štïe
15. umi^{n} mulci ši do^{m}nïele vo^{s}tre sŭ vŭ pŭzici ku^{m} štici ma^{i} bine i b(og)ĭ te ve^{s}(e)li^{t} amï^{n}ŭ

=== Transliteration into modern Romanian orthography ===
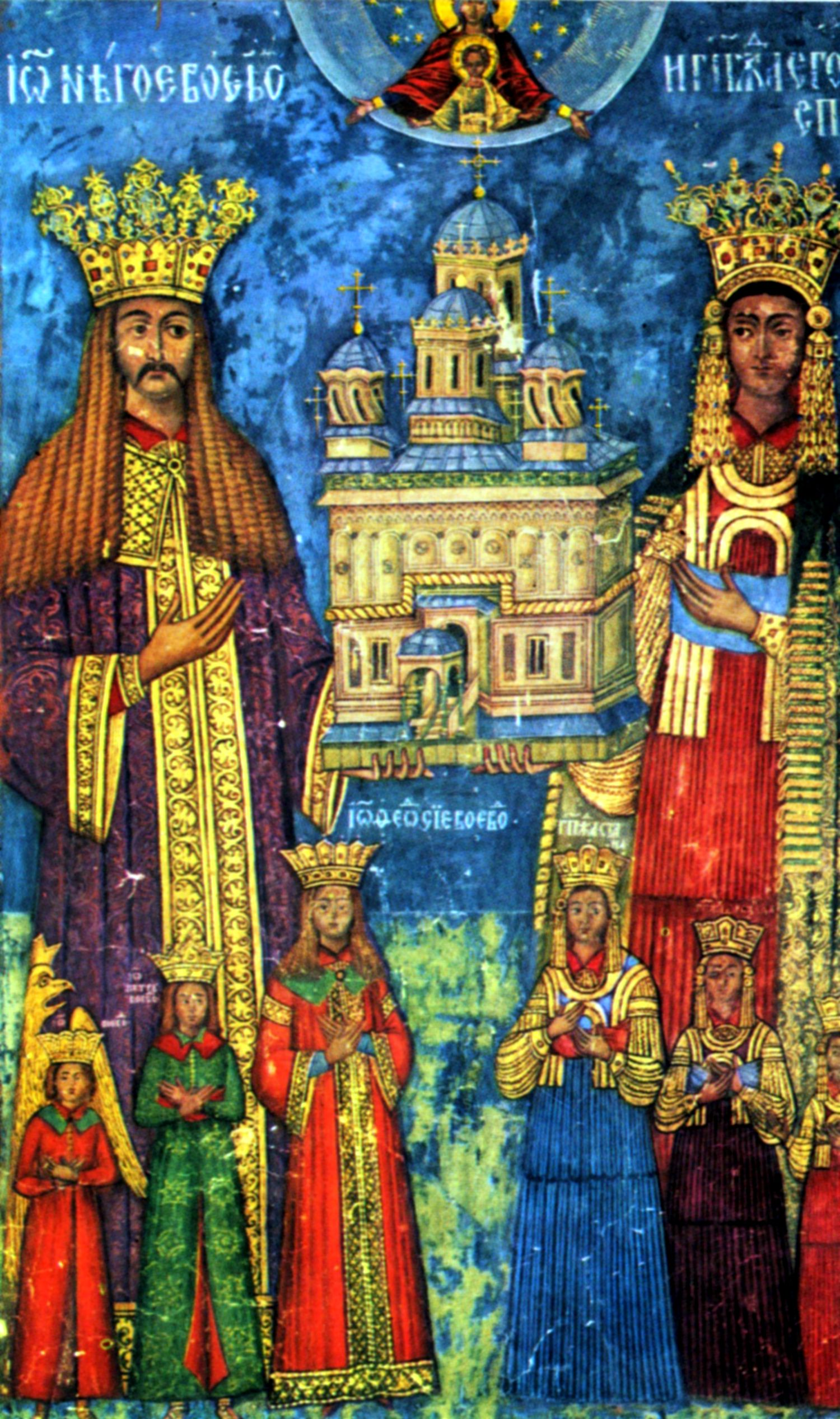
Neagoe Basarab, Prince of Wallachia, pictured on the murals of the Curtea de Argeș Monastery

"Mudromu i plemenitomu, i cistitomu i B(o)gom darovannomu zupan Hanăș Begner ot Brașov mnog(o) zdravie ot Nécșul ot Dlugopole.

I pak dau știre domnietale za lucrul turcilor, cum am auzit eu că împăratul au ieșit den Sofiia și aimintrea nu e. Și se-au dus în sus pre Dunăre.

I pak să știi domniia-ta că au venit un om de la Nicopoe de mie mi-au spus că au văzut cu ochii lui că au trecut ceale corăbii ce știi și domniia-ta pre Dunăre în sus.

I pak să știi că bagă den toate orașele câte 50 de oamini să fie în ajutor în corăbii.

I pak să știi cumu se-au prins nește meșteri den Țarigrad cum vor treace aceale corabii la locul cela strimtul ce știi și domniia ta.

I pak spui domnietale de lucrul lu Mahamet-Beg, cum am auzit de boiari ce sânt megiiaș(i) și de genere-miu Negre, cumu i-au dat împăratul slobozie lui Mahamet-Beg, pre io-i va fi voia pren Țeara Rumânească, iară el să treacă.

I pak să știi domniia ta că are frică mare și Băsărab de acel lotru de Mahamet-Beg, mai vârtos de domniele voastre.

I pak spui domnietale ca mai-marele miu de ce am înțeles și eu. Eu spui domnietale, iară domniia ta ești înțelept și aceaste cuvinte să ții domniiata la tine, să nu știe oamini mulți și domniele vostre să vă păziți cum știți mai bine.

I B(og)i te ves(e)lit, Aminu."

=== English translation ===
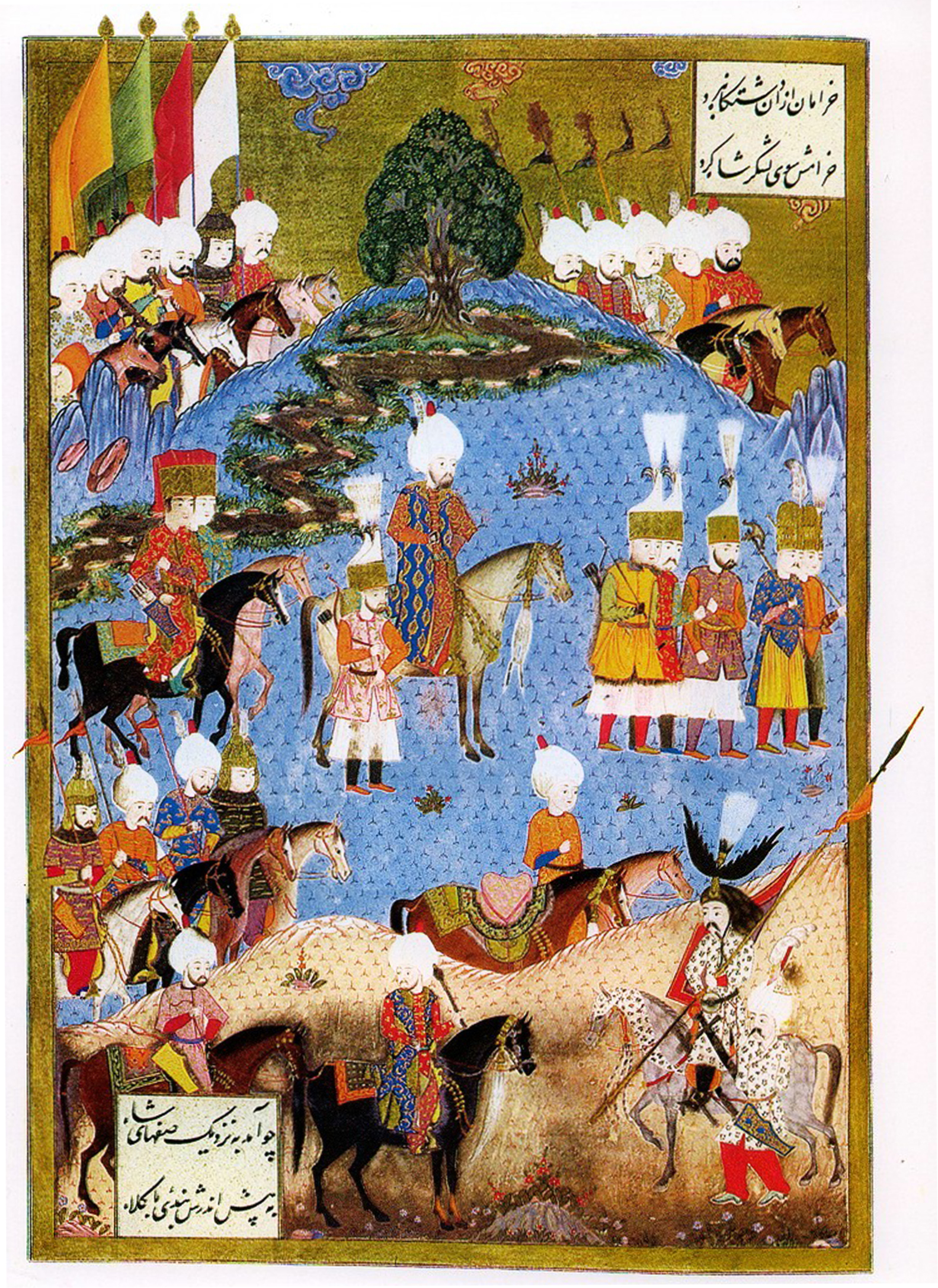
16th century miniature depicting Suleiman the Magnificent marching with his army

"To the most wise and venerable and by God endowed master Hanas Benger of Brașov, much health to thee wisheth Neacșu of Dlăgopole,

And again, I let thy highness know of the deed of the Turks, as I heard that the Emperor hath left Sofia and hath sailed up the Danube, and the truth is no other, but this.

And again, thy highness should know that a man from Nicopole came to me and told me he hath seen with his own eyes how those ships that thy highness knoweth as well have sailed up the Danube.

And again, thou shouldst know that they take fifty men from each town to help on those ships.

And again, thou shouldst know how few sailor(s) from Tzarigrad bound themselves to steer those ships through that narrow place, that thou knowest as well.

And again, I tell thy highness of the work of Mahamet beg as I heard from the boyars that art neighbour and from my son-in-law Negre, how the Emperor hath allowed Mahamet beg cross Wallachia wherever he would want to.

And again, thy highness should know that Basarab is greatly fearful of that thief Mahamet beg, more than thy highness is.

And again, I tell thy highness as thou art my Lord of what had I also understood. I tell thy highness this and thy highness is wise and these words thou shouldst keep for thyself and not let many people know them and thy highness beware as thou best knowest.

And may God give thee grace. Amen"

== Notes ==
^{1} Italics in the original text are in Slavic language
