= Hurmuzaki Psalter =

Oldest writing in Romanian

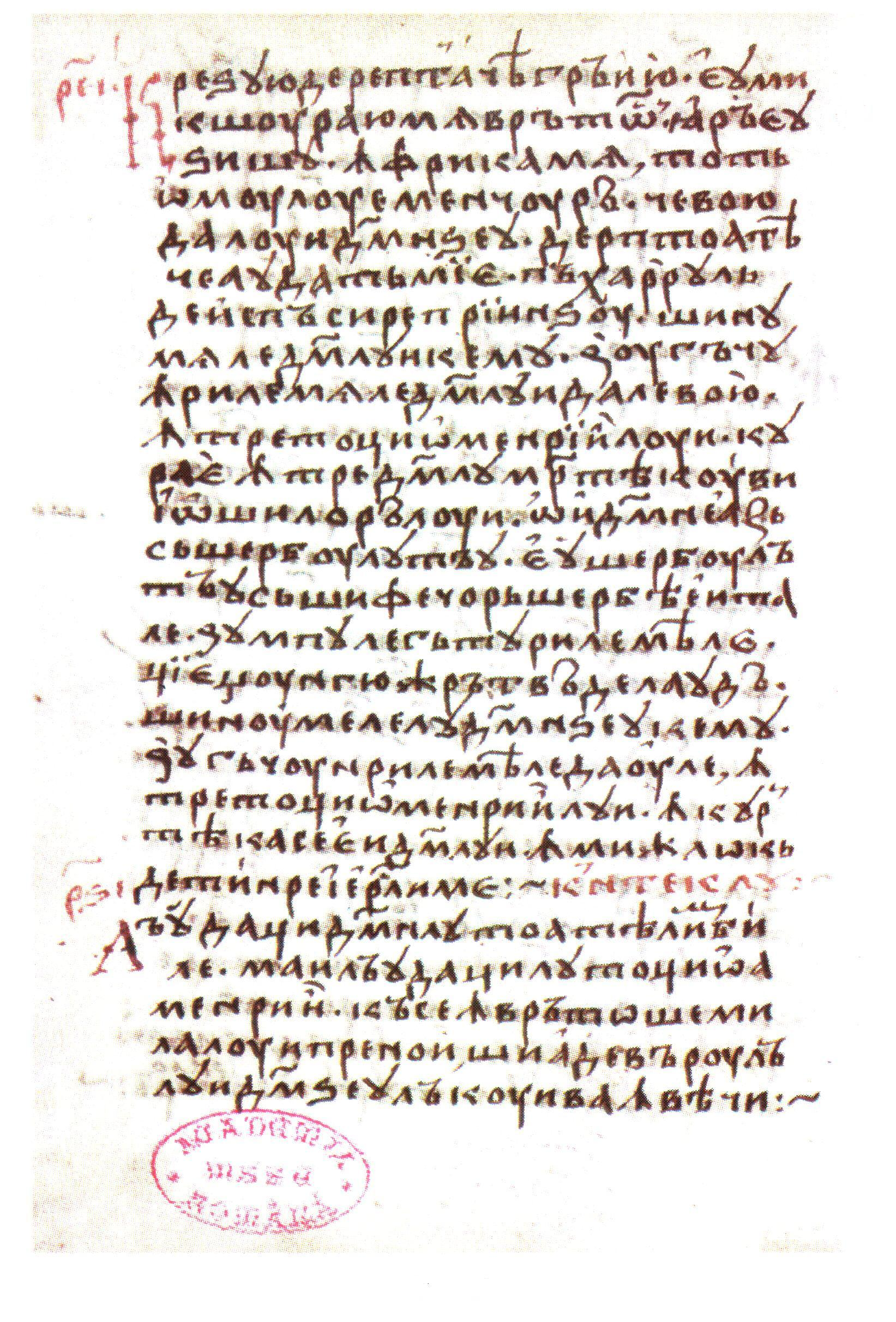
A page from the manuscript

Hurmuzaki Psalter (also spelled Hurmuzachi) is the oldest writing in Romanian. A translation of the Psalter of Branko Mladenović (also known as Codex Bucurestinus), it is dated based on the paper watermarks between 1491 and 1504, making it older than Neacșu's letter.

The manuscript, now in possession of the Romanian Academy, was donated in 1904 from the former personal collection of Eudoxiu Hurmuzachi and bears the name of its former owner.

== Dating ==
Unlike Neacșu's letter which is precisely dated based on the event it is associated with (the Siege of Belgrade), Hurmuzaki Psalter's dating can only be narrowed to a period, and was subject to debate, some placing it before 1521, others after—closer to the advance of Reformation in the region. Researchers studied the watermarks to establish a more accurate timeframe. Ion Aurel Candrea identified the Anchor type watermark and considered the period between 1500 and 1520 as the most likely. Alexandru Mareș, comparing the Anchor watermark's history and the history of another watermark in the manuscript in the form of a ship with two oars and a flag on the mast, proposed that the manuscript was produced before 1501. Iosif Camara concludes that the manuscript could not be dated long after the beginning of the 16th century due to the usage of paper with the exact ship type watermark made in Fabriano in 1468. He considers 1491-1504 as the most likely period.

== Content ==
The first 125 pages of the manuscript are a translation of the 150 Psalms of David, followed by Psalm 151 which is accepted in Eastern Orthodox tradition, and the last 9 are a typikon for the Gospels.

== Origin ==
Several hypothesis have been put forward for the origin of the translation: the area of Maramureș, a location suggested by Nicolae Iorga and supported by Alexandru Rosetti and Gheorghe Ivănescu, among others, linking its creation with the Hussite or Reformed influence in the area. A second area of origin was proposed to be Northern Moldavia, the manuscript being considered a copy of an older translation from the region of Banat-Hunedoara, based on language analysis on the text done during the 1970 and 1980, a hypothesis developed by Ion Gheție. Iosif Camara proposes Mount Athos's Zograf Monastery as the location of the translation, noting the language peculiarities of the text that can be explained as belonging to the Aromanian dialects and the state of monastic writing in Northern Moldavia at the time. He adds that the tying and binding was done at Neamț Monastery.
