= Piephigi =

Ancient people of Dacia

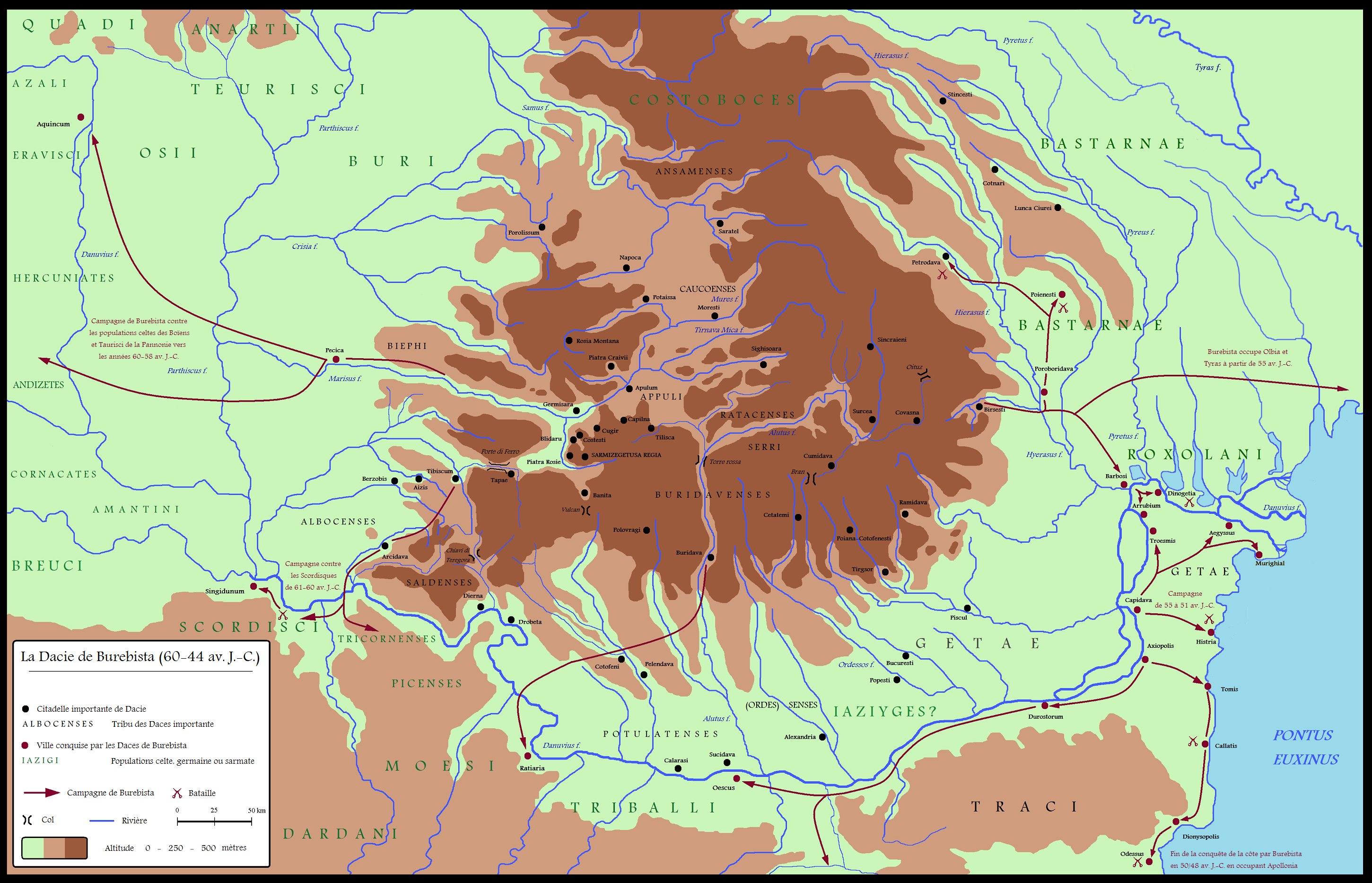
Dacian tribes.

The Piephigi were a Dacian tribe.

== See also ==
- List of ancient cities in Thrace and Dacia
