= Dacian fortress of Breaza =

Dacian Fortress of Breaza
- Location within Romania
- 45.70°N 24.88°E
- Location: Breaza, Brașov, Romania

Site notes
- Condition: Ruined

Monument istoric
- Reference no.: BV-I-m-A-11262.02

The Dacian Fortress of Breaza was a Dacian fortified town.
