= Potulatenses =

Ancient tribe in Romania

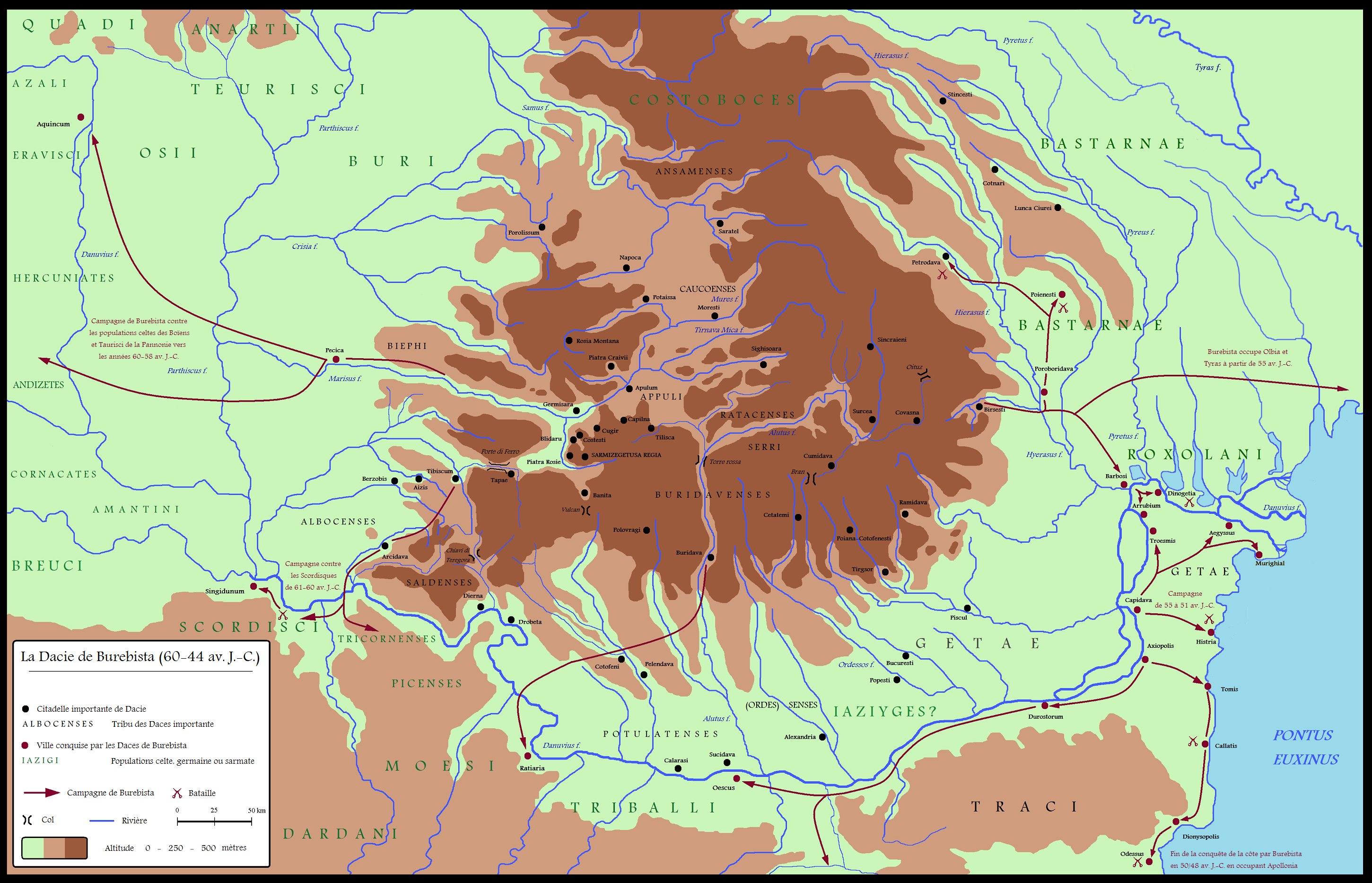
Dacian tribes.

Potulatenses was a Dacian or Getian tribe.

== See also ==
- List of ancient cities in Thrace and Dacia
