= List of ancient Daco-Thracian peoples and tribes =

This is a list of four ancient peoples and their tribes that were possibly related and formed an extinct Indo-European branch of peoples and languages in the eastern Balkans, low Danube basin. These peoples dwelt from west of the Tyras (Dniester) river and east of the Carpathian Mountains in the north, to the north coast of the Aegean Sea in the south, from the west coast of the Pontus Euxinus (Black Sea) in the east, to roughly the Angrus (modern South Morava) river basin, Tisia (modern Tisza) and Danubius (modern Danube) rivers in the west. This list is based in the possible ethnolinguist affiliation of these peoples – Geto-Dacians and Thracians, and not only on a geographical base (that includes other peoples that were not Dacians or Thracians like the Celts that lived in Dacia or in Thrace).

== Ancestors ==
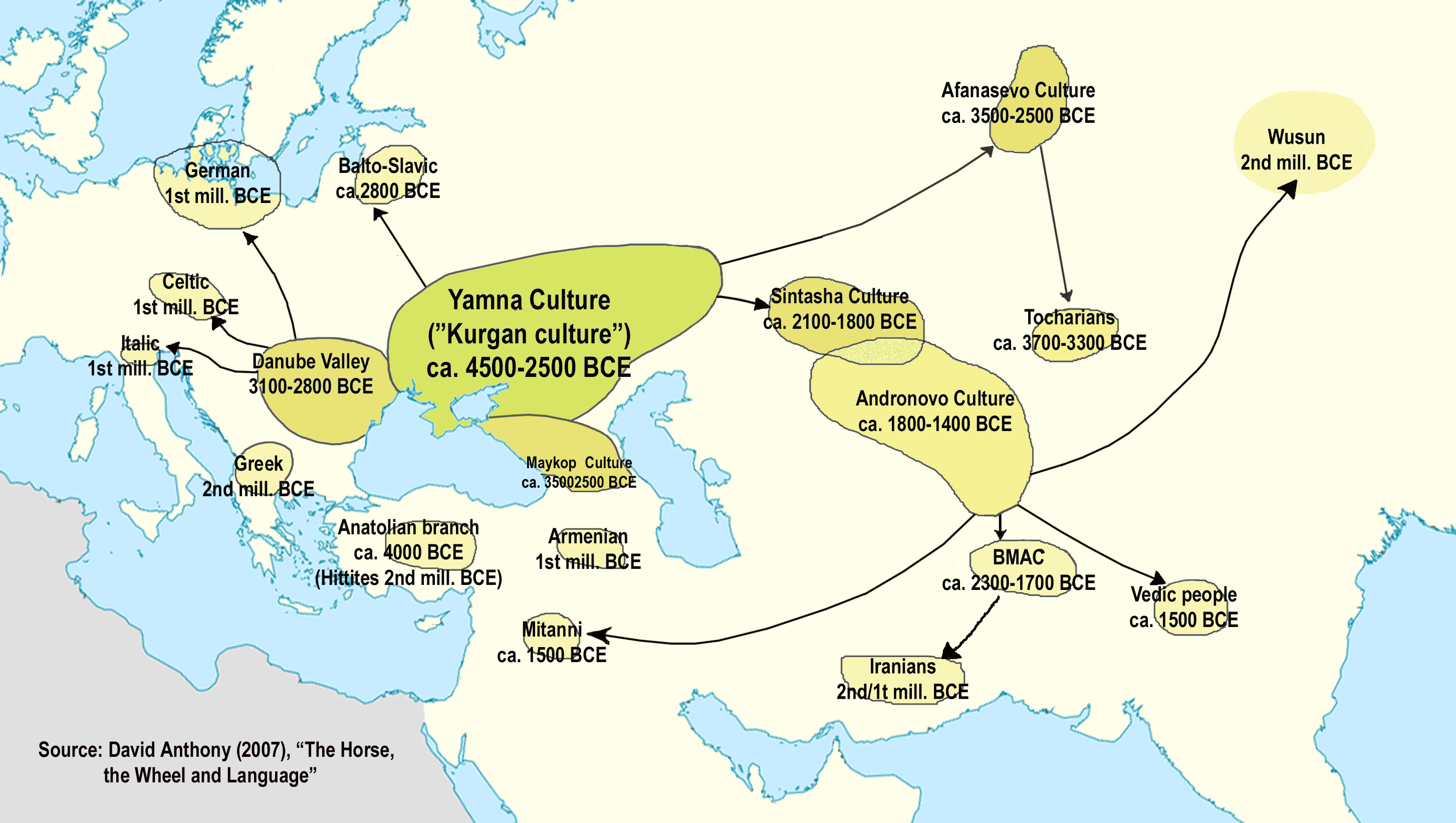
Map 1: Indo-European migrations as described in The Horse, the Wheel, and Language by David W. Anthony

- Proto-Indo-Europeans (Proto-Indo-European speakers)
  - Proto-Daco-Thracians (Proto-Daco-Thracian speakers)

== Geto-Dacians ==
=== Dacians ===
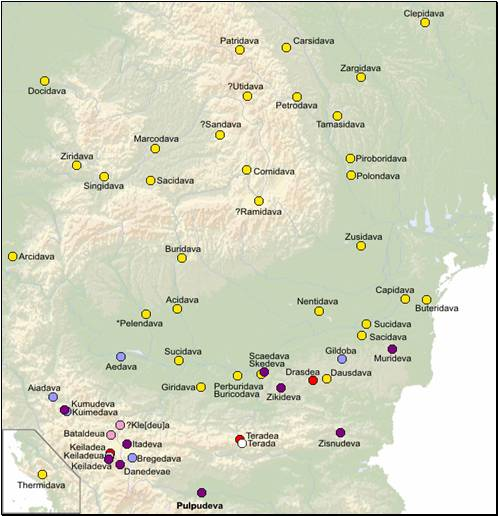
Map 4: Geographical distribution of attested placenames with the -dava suffix, according to Olteanu (2010). The dava distribution confirms Dacia and Moesia as the zone of Dacian speech. The dava zone is, with few exceptions, consistent with Ptolemy's definition of Dacia's borders. There is no conclusive evidence that Dacian was a predominant language outside the dava zone in the 1st century AD. According to Strabo, the Thracians spoke the same language as the Dacians, in which case Dacian was spoken as far as the Aegean sea and the Bosporus. But Strabo's view is controversial among modern linguists: dava placenames are absent south of the Balkan Mountains, with one exception (see Thracian, below)

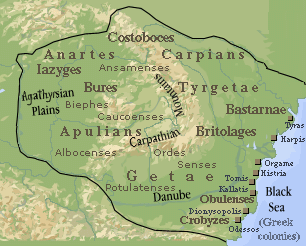
Map 5: Dacian kingdom during the reign of Burebista, 82 BC, showing Dacian and Getae tribes.

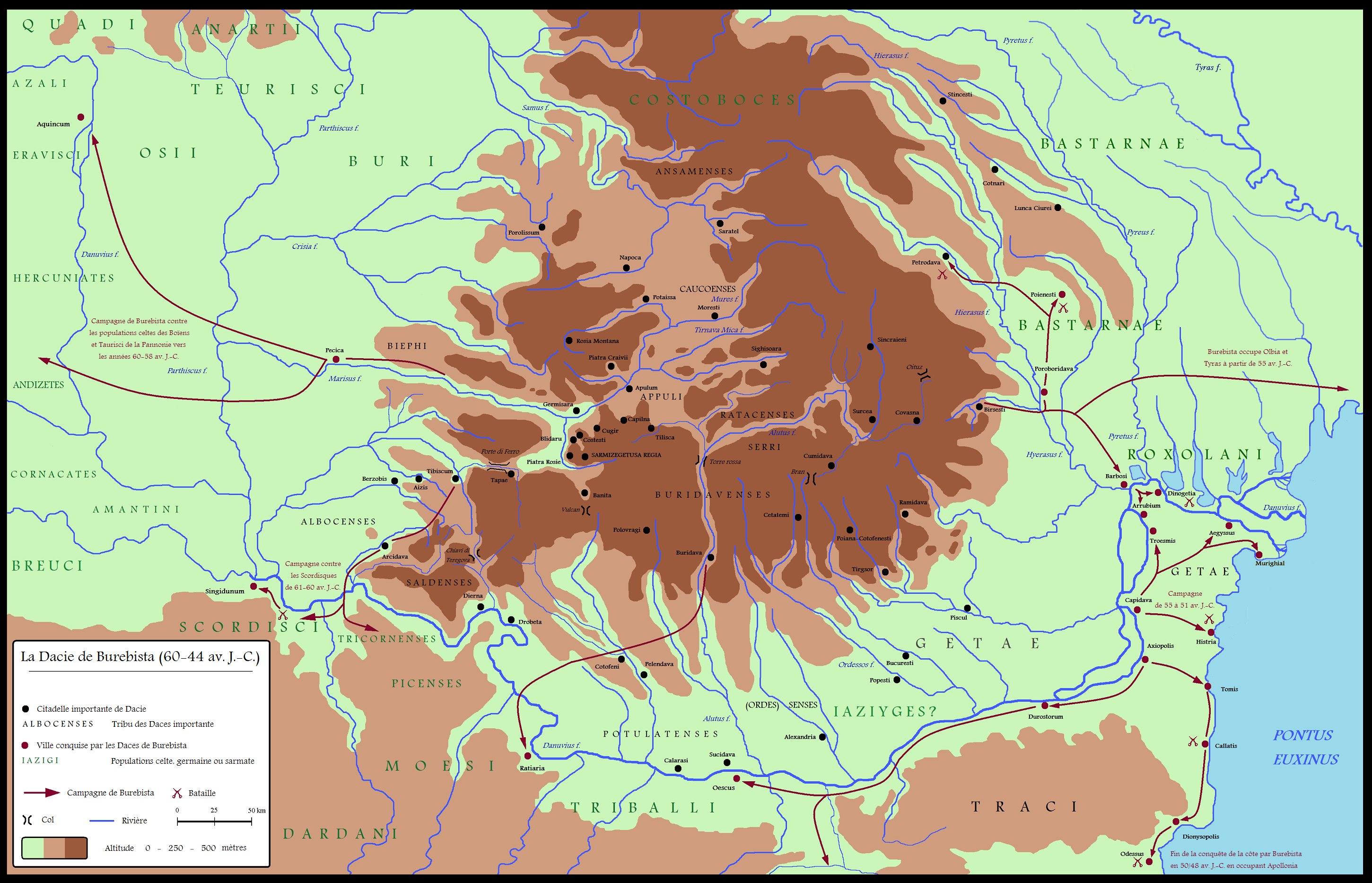
Map 6: Dacian tribes.

- Dacians / Daci (a closely related people to the Getae, mainly west of the Carpathian Mountains, roughly matching the Dacia Superior Roman Province)
  - Albocenses
  - Ansamenses
  - Apuli / Appuli / Apulenses (Dacian Apuli) with the center at Apulon
  - Biephi / Biephes
  - Bures / Buri (Northwest Buri), they lived in the northwest of Dacia - South of Slovak Carpathians, in the Upper Basin of the Tisia / Tisza, although related, they were a different tribe from the one centered in Buridava. (not to be confused with the Germanic tribe called Buri)
  - Caucoenses or Cauci
  - Costoboci / Costoboces / Coertoboci also Koistobokoi and Koistobokoi Montanoi
  - Osi / Osii, they were a Dacian tribe but it is also argued that it was Germanic or Celtic. It was among the enemies of the Romans in the Marcomannic Wars (166-180 AD), according to Julius Capitolinus"
  - Predasenses / Predavensii
  - Ratacenses / Rhadacenses
  - Saboci / Sabokoi, they were a Dacian tribe, among the enemies of the Romans in the Marcomannic Wars (166-180 AD), according to Julius Capitolinus"
  - Serri
  - Senses / Sensii
  - Suci
  - Trixae
- Getae (a closely related people to the Dacians, mainly east of the Carpathian Mountains, roughly matching the Dacia Inferior Roman Province)
  - Britolages
  - Buridavenses / Burridensii (Southeast Buri), their capital was Buridava, on the southern slope of the Carpathian Mountains (although related, they were a different tribe from the one that lived in the northwest of Dacia - South of Slovak Carpathians, in the Upper Basin of the Tisia (modern Tisza) (not to be confused with the Germanic tribe called Buri)
  - Carpi / Carpiani / Carpians, Carpathian Mountains name is based on this tribe
  - Ciaginsi / Ciagisi
  - Cotesii
  - Crobyzi / Krobyzoi / Crobidae, perhaps Getae/
  - Getae Proper
    - Aedi
    - Clariae
    - Scaugdae
  - Harpii
  - Obulenses
  - Ordes
  - Piephigi
  - Potulatenses
  - Saldenses / Saldensii
  - Terici / Terizi
  - Tyragetae / Tyrageti
  - Troglodytae (Getian Troglodytae)

==== Dacians mixed with other peoples ====
===== Daco-Celts =====
- Anartes / Anarti (Dacianized Celtic tribe, Celtic origin tribe later assimilated by the Dacians)
- Teurisci

===== Daco-Scythians =====
- Napae (Dacianized Scythian tribe, Scythian origin tribe later assimilated by the Dacians, after whom the city of Napoca is possibly named

== Thracians ==
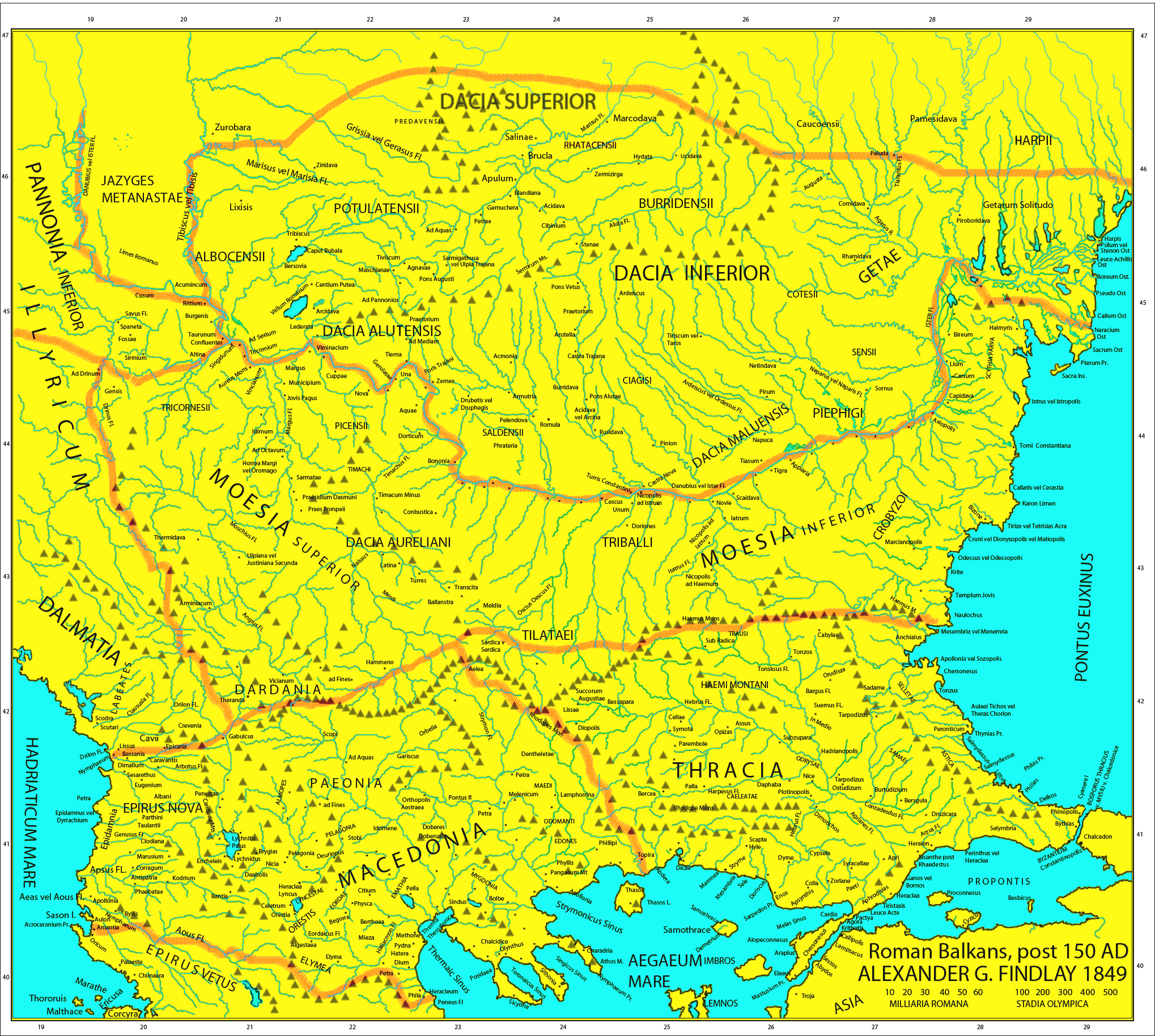
Map 8: 1849 map of Roman regions, fortresses and tribes in Thrace and Dacia (about 150 AD)

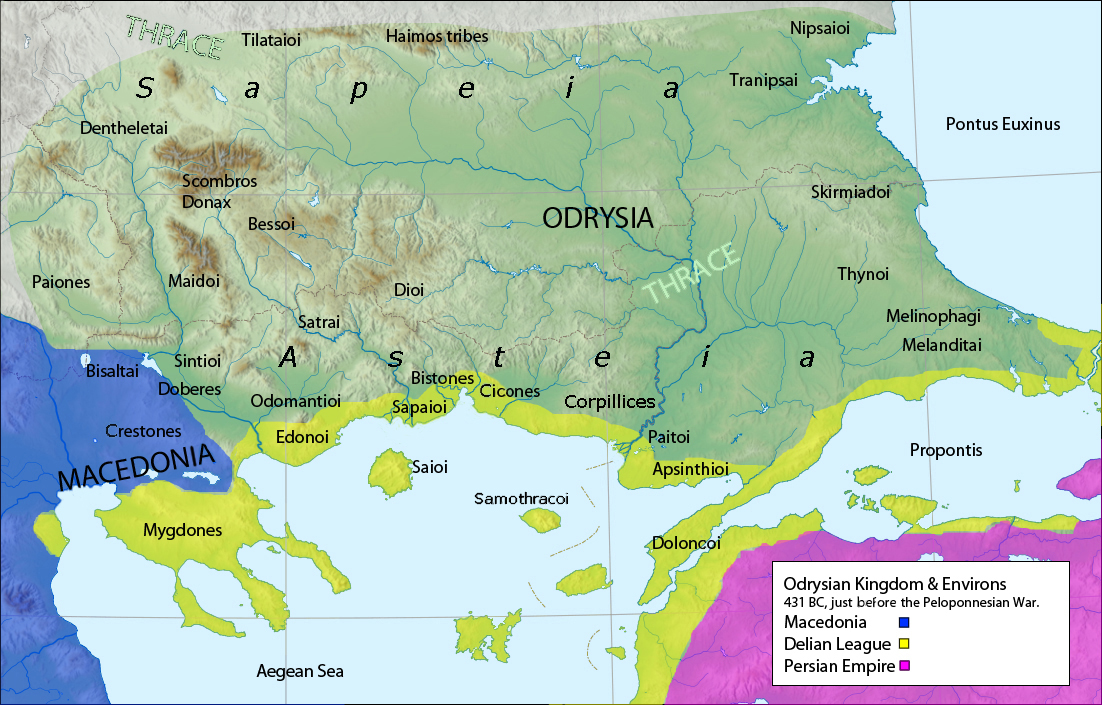
Map 9: Thracian tribes in Thrace and the Odrysian Kingdom, Odrysians were one of the most powerful Thracian tribes. Sapeia, a name derived from the Sapaei tribe, was Northern Thrace and Asteia, a name derived from the Astae or Asti tribe, was Southern Thrace.

Certain tribes and subdivisions of tribes were named differently by ancient writers but modern research points out that these were in fact the same tribe. The name Thracians itself seems to be a Greek exonym and we have no way of knowing what the Thracians called themselves. Also certain tribes mentioned by Homer are not indeed historical.

- Agrianes (it is also claimed that this tribe was Paeonian)
- Apsynthii
- Artacii / Artakioi
- Astae / Asti, they appear in the 2nd century BC to 1st century BC
- Beni
- Bessi / Biessoi, they were among the enemies of the Romans in the Marcomannic Wars (166-180 AD), according to Julius Capitolinus"
- Bisaltae
- Bistones
- Bithyni or Bythini, migrated to Asia Minor or Anatolia
- Brenae
- Caeni / Kainoi
- Cebrenii
- Cicones (Kikones), mentioned by Homer in Odyssey
- Coelaletae
- Coreli / Coralli
- Corpili / Corpillices
- Crousi
- Dersaei
- Dentheletae
- Derrones (it is also claimed that this tribe was Paeonian)
- Digeri
- Dii / Dioi
- Diobesi
- Dolonci
- Edoni / Edones
- Maduateni
- Maedi
  - MaedoBythini, Maedi that migrated to Asia Minor or Anatolia
- Melanditae
- Melinophagi
- Nipsaei
- Odomanti / Odomantes (it is also claimed that this tribe was Paeonian)
- Odrysae / Odrysians
- Paeti
- Pieres (They also may have been a Brygian tribe, related to the Phrygians and the Mygdones, and not a Thracian tribe)
- Saii / Saioi / Saianes (Saians) - Thracian tribe that inhabited Thassos island before Phoenician and Greek colonization.
- Samothraci / Samothrakoi - Thracian tribe that lived in the island of Samothrace after the Pelasgians and before the Greeks that came from Samos island.
- Sapaei, close to Abdera, ruled Thrace after the Odrysians
- Satrae / Satri
- Scyrmiadae
- Sintians
- Sithones
- Sycaeboae
- Thyni, migrated to Asia Minor/Anatolia
- Tilataei
- Tralles
- Tranipsae
- Trausi
- Treres
- Triballi

=== Thracians mixed with other peoples ===
==== Thraco-Celts ====
- Tricornenses / Tricornesii (Romanized Thraco-Celtic community, artificially created by the Romans, that replaced the Celtic Celegeri)

==== Thraco-Phrygians ====
Mixed tribes of Thracians and Phrygians, however Phrygians seem to have been a people ethnolinguistically closer to the Hellenic peoples, Greeks and ancient Macedonians, and not to the Thracians.

- Mygdones
- Pieres (They also may have been a Brygian tribe, related to the Phrygians and the Mygdones, and not a Thracian tribe)

== Possible Daco-Thracian peoples ==
=== Paeonians (Paeones) ===
There are different views and still no agreement among scholars about the Paeonians' ethnic and linguistic kinship. Some such as Wilhelm Tomaschek and Paul Kretschmer claim that the language spoken by the Paeonians belonged to the Illyrian family, while Dimitar Dechev claims affinities with Thracian. Irwin L. Merker considers that the language spoken by the Paeonians was closely related to Greek (and ancient Macedonian if it was a distinct language from ancient Greek), a Hellenic language with "a great deal of Illyrian and Thracian influence as a result of this proximity".

Map 10: Paionian tribes (in yellow, north and northeast of Ancient Macedonians)

- Agrianes (also, Agriani and Agrii) (it is also claimed that this tribe was Thracian)
- Almopians (also Almopioi)
- Derrones (also Derroni) (it is also claimed that this tribe was Thracian)
- Doberes
- Laeaeans (also Laeaei and Laiai)
- Odomantes (also Odomanti) (it is also claimed that this tribe was Thracian)
- Paeoplae
- Siropaiones

=== Phrygians ===
Some scholars as Strabo believe that the Phrygians are Thracian tribe.

=== Cimmerians ===
- Cimmerians could have been a people of Thracian-Dacian origin with an Iranian overlordship, a mixture of Thracians and Iranians or a missing link and a transitional people between Indo-Iranian peoples and Thracians and Dacians.

== Sources ==
=== Ancient ===
- Appian (165). Historia Romana [Roman History] (in Ancient Greek).
- Dio, Cassius (2008). Rome. Vol. 3 (of 6). Echo Library. ISBN 978-1-4068-2644-9.
- Cassius, Dio Cocceianus; Cary, Earnest; Foster, Herbert Baldwin (1968). Dio's Roman history, volume 8. W. Heinemann.
- Herodotus. Histories (in Ancient Greek).
- Pliny (the Elder); Rackham, Harris (1971). Pliny Natural History, Volume 2. Harvard University Press.
- Strabo. Geographica [Geography] (in Ancient Greek).
- Strabo; Jones, Horace Leonard; Sterrett, John Robert (1967). The geography of Strabo. Harvard University Press.

=== Modern ===
- Abramea, Anna P (1994). Thrace. Idea Advertising-Marketing. ISBN 978-9608560918.
- Alecu-Călușiță, Mioara (1992). "Steagul geto-dacilor" [The Geto-Dacians' Flag] (PDF). Noi Tracii (in Romanian) (210). Rome: Centro Europeo di Studii Traci. Archived from the original (PDF) on 2013-10-02.
- Applebaum, Shimon (1976). Prolegomena to the study of the second Jewish revolt (A.D. 132–135). BAR.
- Astarita, Maria Laura (1983). Avidio Cassio. Ed. di Storia e Letteratura. OCLC 461867183.
- Barnes, Timothy D. (1984). Constantine and Eusebius. Harvard. ISBN 978-0674165311.
- Barbulescu, Mihai; Nagler, Thomas (2005). The History of Transylvania: Until 1541. Coordinator Pop, Ioan Aurel. Cluj-Napoca: Romanian Cultural Institute. ISBN 978-9737784001.
- Berresford Ellis, Peter (1996). Celt and Greek: Celts in the Hellenic World. Constable & Robinson. ISBN 978-0094755802.
- Bennett, Julian (1997). Trajan: Optimus Princeps. Routledge. ISBN 978-0415165242.
- Boak, Arthur E. R.; Sinnigen, William G. (1977). A History of Rome to A.D. 565 (6th Rev ed.). Macmillan. ISBN 978-0029796900.
- Boila, Lucian (2001). Romania: Borderland of Europe. Reaktion. ISBN 978-1861891037.
- Bowman, Alan; Cameron, Averil; Garnsey, Peter (2005). The Crisis of Empire, AD 193–337. The Cambridge Ancient History. Vol. 12. CUP. ISBN 978-0521301992.
- Brixhe, Claude (2008). Phrygian in The Ancient Languages of Asia Minor. CUP. ISBN 978-0521684965.
- Bunbury, Edward Herbert (1979). A history of ancient geography among the Greeks and Romans: from the earliest ages till the fall of the Roman empire. London: Humanities Press International. ISBN 978-9070265113.
- Bunson, Matthew (1995). A Dictionary of the Roman Empire. OUP. ISBN 978-0195102338.
- Bunson, Matthew (2002). Roman Empire, Encyclopedia of The, Revised Edition. Fitzhenry & Whiteside; 2nd Revised edition. ISBN 978-0816045624.
- Burns, Thomas S. (1991). A History of the Ostrogoths. Indiana University Press. ISBN 978-0253206008.
- Bury, John Bagnell; Cook, Stanley Arthur; Adcock, Frank E.; Percival Charlesworth, Martin (1954). Rome and the Mediterranean, 218-133 BC. The Cambridge Ancient History. Macmillan.
- Cardos, G; Stoian, V; Miritoiu, N; Comsa, A; Kroll, A; Voss, S; Rodewald, A (2004). Paleo-mtDNA analysis and population genetic aspects of old Thracian populations from South-East of Romania. Romanian Society of legal medicine.
- Chakraberty, Chandra (1948). The prehistory of India: tribal migrations. Vijayakrishna.
- Clarke, John R. (2003). Art in the Lives of Ordinary Romans: Visual Representation and Non-Elite Viewers in Italy, 100 B.C.-A.D. 315. University of California. ISBN 978-0520219762.
- Conti, Stefano; Scardigli, Barbara; Torchio, Maria Cristina (2007). Geografia e viaggi nell'antichità. Ancona. ISBN 978-8873260905.
- Cowan, Ross (2003). Imperial Roman Legionary AD 161–284. Osprey. ISBN 978-1841766010.
- Crișan, Ion Horațiu (1978). Burebista and his time. Bibliotheca historica Romaniae. Translated by Sanda Mihailescu. Bucuresti: Editura Academiei Republicii Socialiste Romania.
- Crossland, R.A.; Boardman, John (1982). Linguistic problems of the Balkan area in the late prehistoric and early Classical period. The Cambridge Ancient History. Vol. 3. CUP. ISBN 978-0521224963.
- Cunliffe, Barry W. (1994). Rome and Her Empire. Constable. ISBN 978-0094735002.
- Denne Parker, Henry Michael (1958). A history of the Roman world from AD 138 to 337. Methuen.
- Dumitrescu, Vlad; Boardman, John; Hammond, N. G. L; Sollberger, E (1982). The prehistory of Romania from the earliest times to 1000 BC. The Cambridge Ancient History. CUP. ISBN 978-0521224963.
- Duridanov, Ivan (1985). Die Sprache der Thraker [The Language of the Thracians]. Bulgarische Sammlung (in German). Neuried: Hieronymus Verlag. ISBN 978-3888930317.
- Eisler, Robert (1951). Man into wolf: an anthropological interpretation of sadism, masochism, and lycanthropy. London: Routledge and Kegan Paul. ASIN B0000CI25D.
- Eliade, Mircea (1986). Zalmoxis, the vanishing God: comparative studies in the religions and folklore of Dacia and Eastern Europe. University of Chicago Press. ISBN 978-0226203850.
- Eliade, Mircea (1995). Ivănescu, Maria; Ivănescu, Cezar (eds.). De la Zalmoxis la Genghis-Han: studii comparative despre religiile și folclorul Daciei și Europei Orientale [From Zalmoxis to Genghis Khan: comparative studies in the religions and folklore of Dacia and Eastern Europe] (in Romanian) (Based on the translation from French of De Zalmoxis à Gengis-Khan, Payot, Paris, 1970 ed.). București, Romania: Humanitas. ISBN 978-9732805541.
- Ellis, L. (1998). 'Terra deserta': population, politics, and the [de]colonization of Dacia. World archaeology. Routledge. ISBN 978-0415198097.
- Ellis, Robert (1861). The Armenian origin of the Etruscans. Parker, Son and Bourn.
- Elton, Hugh; Lenski, Noel Emmanuel (2005). "Warfare and the Military". The Cambridge Companion to the Age of Constantine. CUP. ISBN 978-0521818384.
- Encyclopædia Britannica (26 September 2023). "Dacia". Encyclopædia Britannica.
- Everitt, Anthony (2010). Hadrian and the Triumph of Rome. Random House Trade. ISBN 978-0812978148.
- Fisher, Iancu (2003). Les substrats et leur influence sur les langues romanes: la Romania du Sud-Est / Substrate und ihre Wirkung auf die romanischen Sprachen: Sudostromania in Romanische Sprachgeschichte. Mouton De Gruyter. ISBN 978-3110146943.
- Florov, Irina (2001). The 3000-year-old hat: New connections with Old Europe : the Thraco-Phrygian world. Golden Vine. ISBN 978-0968848708.
- Fol, Alexander (1996). "Thracians, Celts, Illyrians and Dacians". In de Laet, Sigfried J. (ed.). History of Humanity. History of Humanity. Vol. 3: From the seventh century B.C. to the seventh century A.D. UNESCO. ISBN 978-9231028120.
- Georgiev, Vladimir Ivanov (1960). Българска етимология и ономастика (in Bulgarian and French). Sofia: Bŭlgarska akademii︠a︡ na naukite. Institut za Bŭlgarski ezik.
- Glodariu, Ioan (1976). Dacian trade with the Hellenistic and Roman world. British Archaeological Reports. ISBN 978-0904531404.
- Glodariu, Ioan; Pop, Ioan Aurel; Nagler, Thomas (2005). "The history and civilization of the Dacians". The history of Transylvania Until 1541. Romanian Cultural Institute, Cluj Napoca. ISBN 978-9737784001.
- Goffart, Walter A. (2006). Barbarian Tides: The Migration Age and the Later Roman Empire. University of Pennsylvania Press. ISBN 978-0812239393.
- Groh, Vladimir (1964). Mnema. Univerzita J.E. Purkyně v Brně. Filozofická fakulta.
- Grumeza, Ion (2009). Dacia: Land of Transylvania, Cornerstone of Ancient Eastern Europe. Hamilton Books. ISBN 978-0-7618-4465-5.
- Gibbon, Edward (1776) [2008]. The History of the Decline and Fall of the Roman Empire. Vol. I. Cosimo Classics. ISBN 978-1605201207.
- Garašanin, Milutin V.; Benac, Alojz (1973). Actes du VIIIe congrès international des sciences préhistoriques (in French). International Union of Prehistoric and Protohistoric Sciences.
- Georgescu, Vlad (1991). Matei Calinescu (ed.). The Romanians – A History. Translated by Alexandra Bley-Vroman. I. B. Tauris. ISBN 978-1850433323.
- Gibbon, Edward (1776) [2008]. The History of the Decline and Fall of the Roman Empire. Vol. I. Cosimo Classics. ISBN 978-1605201207.
- Goodman, Martin; Sherwood, Jane (2002). The Roman World 44 BC–AD 180. Routledge. ISBN 978-0203408612.
- Hainsworth, J.B. (1982). "The relationships of the ancient languages of the Balkan". In Boardman, John (ed.). The Cambridge Ancient History. Vol. 3 (2nd ed.). CUP. ISBN 978-0521224963.
- Hazel, John (2002). Who's Who in the Roman World. Routledge. ISBN 978-0203425992.
- Heather, Peter (2006). The Fall of the Roman Empire: A New History of Rome and the Barbarians. OUP. ISBN 978-0195159547.
- Heather, Peter (2010). Empires and Barbarians: Migration, Development, and the Birth of Europe. OUP. ISBN 978-0199735600.
- Husovská, Ludmilá (1998). Slovakia: walking through centuries of cities and towns. Príroda. ISBN 978-8007010413.
- Jażdżewski, Konrad (1948). Atlas to the prehistory of the Slavs. Translated by Teresa A. Dmochowska. Łódzkie Towarzystwo Naukowe / Łodz Scientific Society.
- Jeanmaire, Henri (1975). Couroi et courètes (in French). New York: Arno. ISBN 978-0405070013.
- Kephart, Calvin (1949). Sanskrit: its origin, composition, and diffusion. Shenandoah.
- Koch, John T (2005). "Dacians and Celts". Celtic culture: a historical encyclopedia. Vol. 1. ABC-CLIO. ISBN 978-1851094400.
- Köpeczi, Béla; Makkai, Laszlo; Mócsy, András; Szász, Zoltán; Barta, Gabor (2002). History of Transylvania – From the Beginnings to 1606 (in Hungarian). East European Monographs. ISBN 978-0880334792.
- Kostrzewski, Józef (1949). Les origines de la civilisation polonaise. Press University of France.
- Lemny, Stefan; Iorga, Nicolae (1984). Vasile Pârvan. Editura Eminescu.
- Lewis, D. M.; Boardman, John; Hornblower, Simon; Ostwald, M., eds. (2008). The fourth century B.C. The Cambridge ancient history. Vol. 6 (7 ed.). CUP. ISBN 978-0521233484.
- Luttwak, Edward N. (1976). The grand strategy of the Roman Empire from the first century A.D. to the third. Baltimore: Johns Hopkins. ISBN 978-0801818639.
- MacKendrick, Paul Lachlan (2000). The Dacian Stones Speak. Chapel Hill, North Carolina: University of North Carolina. ISBN 978-0807849392.
- MacKenzie, Andrew (1986). Archaeology in Romania: the mystery of the Roman occupation. Robert Hale. ISBN 978-0709027249.
- Millar, Fergus (2004). Cotton, Hannah M.; Rogers, Guy M. (eds.). Rome, the Greek World, and the East. Vol. 2: Government, Society, and Culture in the Roman Empire. University of North Carolina. ISBN 978-0807855201.
- Millar, Fergus (1981). Roman Empire and Its Neighbours (2nd illus. ed.). Gerald Duckworth. ISBN 978-0715614525.
- Minns, Ellis Hovell (1913) [2011]. Scythians and Greeks: a survey of ancient history and archaeology on the north coast of the Euxine from the Danube to the Caucasus. CUP. ISBN 978-1108024877.
- Mountain, Harry (1998). The Celtic Encyclopedia. Universal. ISBN 978-1581128901.
- Mulvin, Lynda (2002). Late Roman Villas in the Danube-Balkan Region. BAR. ISBN 978-1841714448.
- Nandris, John (1976). Friesinger, Herwig; Kerchler, Helga; Pittioni, Richard; Mitscha-Märheim, Herbert (eds.). "The Dacian Iron Age – A Comment in a European Context". Archaeologia Austriaca. 13 (13–14) (Festschrift für Richard Pittioni zum siebzigsten Geburtstag ed.). Vienna: Deuticke. ISBN 978-3700544203. ISSN 0003-8008.
- Niessen, James P. (2004). Eastern Europe: An Introduction to the People, Lands, and Culture. ABC-CLIO. ISBN 978-1576078006.
- Nixon, C. E. V.; Saylor Rodgers, Barbara (1995). In Praise of Later Roman Emperors: The Panegyric Latini. University of California. ISBN 978-0520083264.
- Oltean, Ioana Adina (2007). Dacia: landscape, colonisation and romanisation. Routledge. ISBN 978-0415412520.
- Otto, Karl-Heinz [in German] (2000). "Deutscher Verlag der Wissenschaften". Ethnographisch-archäologische Zeitschrift. 41. Humboldt-Universität zu Berlin.
- Paliga, Sorin (1999). Thracian and pre-Thracian studies: linguistic papers published between 1986 and 1996. Sorin Paliga.
- Paliga, Sorin (2006). Etymological Lexicon of the Indigenous (Thracian) Elements in Romanian. Fundatia Evenimentul. ISBN 978-9738792005.
- Papazoglu, Fanula (1978). The Central Balkan Tribes in Pre-Roman Times:Triballi, Autariatae, Dardanians, Scordisci, & Moesians, translated by Mary Stansfield-Popovic. Hakkert. ISBN 978-9025607937.
- Pares, Bernard Sir; Seton-Watso, Robert William; Williams, Harold; Brooke Jopson, Norman (1939). The Slavonic and East European review: a survey of the peoples of eastern Europe, their history, economics, philology and literature. Vol. 18–19. W.S. Manely.
- Pârvan, Vasile (1926). Getica (in Romanian and French). București, Romania: Cvltvra Națională.
- Parvan, Vasile (1928). Dacia. CUP.
- Parvan, Vasile; Vulpe, Alexandru; Vulpe, Radu (2002). Dacia. Editura 100+1 Gramar. ISBN 978-9735913618.
- Parvan, Vasile; Florescu, Radu (1982). Getica. Editura Meridiane.
- Peregrine, Peter N.; Ember, Melvin (2001). "Encyclopedia of Prehistory: Volume 4: Europe". Encyclopedia of Prehistory. Vol. 4 : Europe. Springer. ISBN 978-0306462580.
- Petolescu, Constantin C (2000). Inscriptions de la Dacie romaine : inscriptions externes concernant l'histoire de la Dacie (Ier-IIIe siècles). Enciclopedica. ISBN 978-9734501823.
- Pittioni, Richard; Kerchler, Helga; Friesinger, Herwig; Mitscha-Märheim, Herbert (1976). Festschrift für Richard Pittioni zum siebzigsten Geburtstag, Archaeologia Austriaca : Beiheft. Wien, Deuticke, Horn, Berger. ISBN 978-3700544203.
- Poghirc, Cicerone (1989). Thracians and Mycenaeans: Proceedings of the Fourth International Congress of Thracology Rotterdam 1984. Brill Academic Pub. ISBN 978-9004088641.
- Polomé, Edgar C. (1983). Linguistic situation in the western provinces. Walter de Gruyter. ISBN 978-3110095258.
- Polomé, Edgar Charles (1982). "20e". In Boardman, John (ed.). Balkan Languages (Illyrian, Thracian and Daco-Moesian). The Cambridge Ancient History. Vol. 3 (2nd ed.). London: CUP. ISBN 978-0521224963.
- Pop, Ioan Aurel (2000). Romanians and Romania: A Brief History. East European Monographs. ISBN 978-0880334402.
- Price, Glanville (2000). Encyclopedia of the Languages of Europe. Wiley-Blackwell. ISBN 978-0631220398.
- Renfrew, Colin (1990). Archaeology and Language, The Puzzle of Indo-European Origins. CUP. ISBN 978-0521386753.
- Roesler, Robert E. (1864). Das vorromische Dacien. Academy, Wien, XLV.
- Rosetti, A. (1982). La linguistique Balkanique in Revue roumaine de linguistique, volume 27. Editions de l'Academie de la RSR.
- Ruscu, D. (2004). William S. Hanson; I. P. Haynes (eds.). The supposed extermination of the Dacians: the literary tradition. Journal of Roman Archaeology. ISBN 978-1887829564.
- Russu, I. Iosif (1967). Limba Traco-Dacilor ('Thraco-Dacian language') (in Romanian). Editura Stiintifica.
- Russu, I. Iosif (1969). Die Sprache der Thrako-Daker ('Thraco-Dacian language') (in German). Editura Stiintifica.
- Scarre, Chris (1995). Chronicle of the Roman Emperors: The Reign-by-Reign Record of the Rulers of Imperial Rome. Thames & Hudson. ISBN 978-0500050774.
- Schmitz, Michael (2005). The Dacian threat, 101–106 AD. Armidale, NSW: Caeros. ISBN 978-0975844502.
- Schütte, Gudmund (1917). Ptolemy's maps of northern Europe: a reconstruction of the prototypes. H. Hagerup.
- Shchukin, Mark (1989). Rome and the barbarians in central and eastern Europe: 1st century BC – 1st century AD. BAR.
- Shchukin, Mark; Kazanski, Michel; Sharov, Oleg (2006). Des les goths aux huns: le nord de la mer Noire au Bas-Empire et a l'époque des grandes migrations. BAR. ISBN 978-1841717562.
- Sidebottom, Harry (2007). "International Relations". The Cambridge History of Greek and Roman Warfare: Volume 2, Rome from the Late Republic to the Late Empire. CUP. ISBN 978-0521782746.
- Skvarna, Dusan; Cicaj, Viliam; Letz, Robert (2000). Slovak History: Chronology & Lexicon. Bolchazy-Carducci. ISBN 978-0865164444.
- Solta, Georg Renatus (1980). Berücksichtigung des Substrats und des Balkanlateinischen. Wissenschaftliche Buchgesellschaft.
- Southern, Pat (2001). The Roman Empire from Severus to Constantin. Routledge. ISBN 978-0203451595.
- Taylor, Timothy (2001). Northeastern European Iron Age pages 210–221 and East Central European Iron Age pages 79–90. Springer Published in conjunction with the Human Relations Area Files. ISBN 978-0306462580.
- Tomaschek, Wilhelm (1883). Les Restes de la langue dace (in French). Belgium: Le Muséon.
- Tomaschek, Wilhelm (1893). Die alten Thraker (in German). Vol. I. Vienna: Tempsky.
- Thomson, James Oliver (1948). History of Ancient Geography. Biblo-Moser. ISBN 978-0819601438.
- Toynbee, Arnold Joseph (1961). A study of history. Vol. 2. OUP.
- Treptow, Kurt W (1996). A History of Romania. Polygon. ISBN 978-0880333450.
- Turnock, David (1988). The Making of Eastern Europe: From the Earliest Times to 1815. Routledge. ISBN 978-0415012676.
- Van den Gheyn, Joseph (1886). "Les populations danubiennes: études d'ethnographie comparée" [The Danubian populations: comparative ethnographic studies]. Revue des questions scientifiques (in French). 17–18. Brussels: Société scientifique de Bruxelles. ISSN 0035-2160.
- Vraciu, Ariton (1980). Limba daco-geţilor. Ed. Facla.
- Vulpe, Alexandru (2001). "Dacia înainte de romani". Istoria Românilor (in Romanian). Vol. 1. Bucharest: Univers Enciclopedic. ISBN 973-4503812.
- Waldman, Carl; Mason, Catherine (2006). Encyclopedia of European Peoples, 2-Volume Set. Facts on File. ISBN 978-0816049646.
- Watson, Alaric (2004). Aurelian and the Third Century. Routledge. ISBN 978-0415301879.
- Westropp, Hodder M. (2003). Handbook of Egyptian, Greek, Etruscan and Roman Archeology. Kessinger Publishing. ISBN 978-0766177338.
- White, David Gordon (1991). Myths of the Dog-Man. University of Chicago. ISBN 978-0226895093.
- Wilcox, Peter (1982). Rome's Enemies (1): Germanics and Dacians. Men at Arms. Vol. 129. Illustrator Gerry Embleton. Osprey. ISBN 978-0850454734.
- Wilkes, John (2005). Alan Bowman; Averil Cameron; Peter Garnsey (eds.). Provinces and Frontiers. The Cambridge Ancient History. Vol. 12 (second ed.). CUP. ISBN 978-0521301992.
- Zambotti, Pia Laviosa (1954). I Balcani e l'Italia nella Preistoria (in Italian). Como.
- Zumpt, Karl Gottlob; Zumpt, August Wilhelm (1852). Eclogae ex Q. Horatii Flacci poematibus page 140 and page 175 by Horace. Philadelphia: Blanchard and Lea.

== See also ==
- Cimmerians
- Dacians
- Getae
- Moesians
- Paeonians
- Prygians
- Scythians
- Thracians
- List of ancient tribes in Thrace and Dacia
