= Pierias =

Pierias (Greek: Πιερίας) may refer to:

- Dylan Pierias (born 2000), Australian association football defender
- Enosi Pontion Pierias, a music festival in Greece

== See also ==
- Pieria (disambiguation)
- Pieres
