= Albocenses =

Ancient people of Dacia

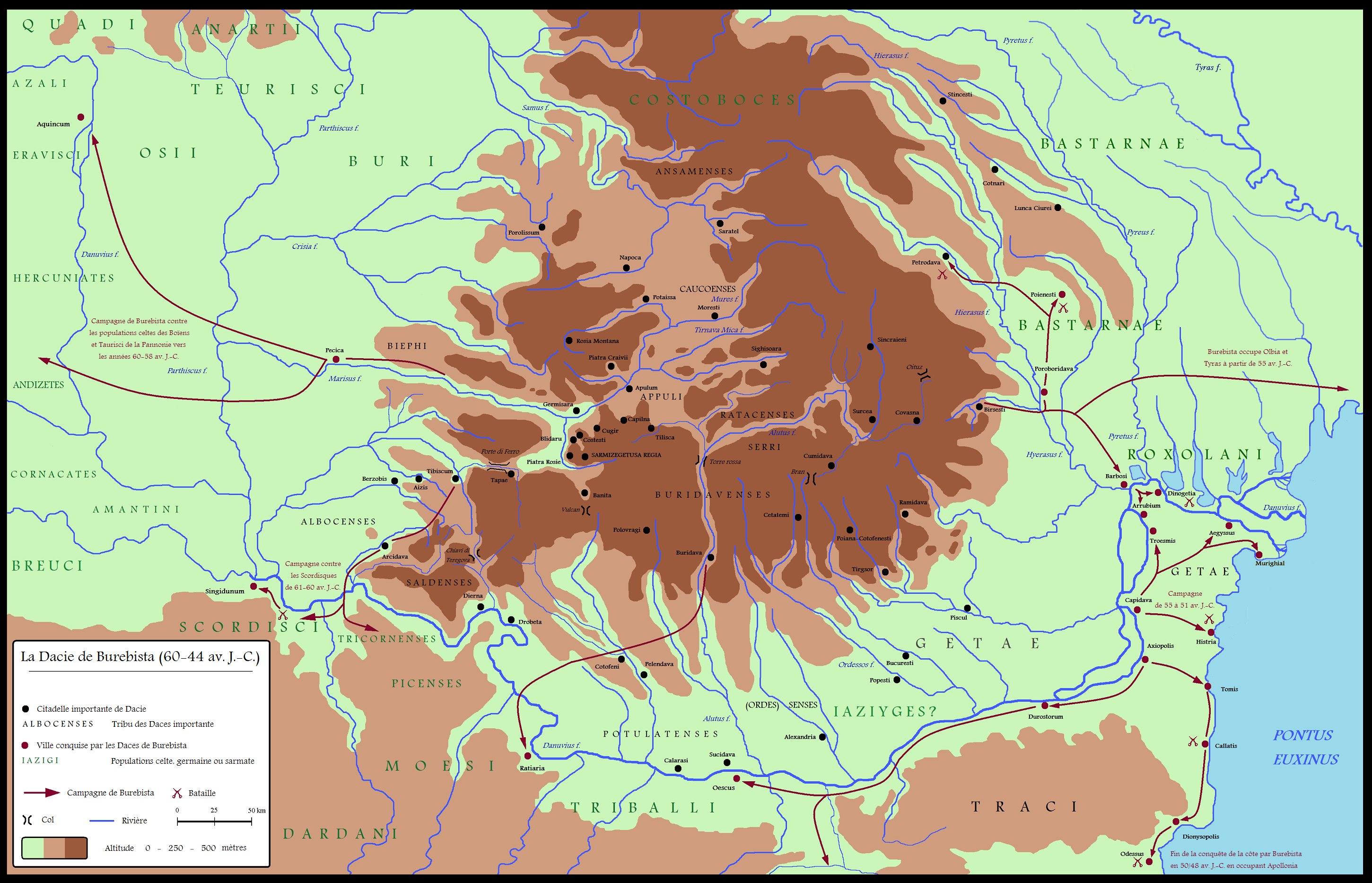
Dacian tribes.

The Albocenses (Latin: Albocenses/Albocensii) were a Dacian tribe that inhabited the area of Banat (Serbia, Romania) with the towns of Kovin (Contra Margum), Trans Tierna, Ad Medias II, Kladovo (Ad Pontes), Apu, Arcidava, Centum Putea, Ram (Lederata) and Praetorium I. They lived between the Timiş River (Tibiscus) and north of the Saldenses, south of the Biephi. It is believed that the tribe migrated to Spain in Roman times.

Maximus of Moesia, the governor of Moesia under Emperor Valens, approached the lands of the Albocenses prior to the Gothic Wars.

== See also ==
- List of ancient tribes in Thrace and Dacia
- List of ancient cities in Thrace and Dacia
- Moesia
