= Odomanti =

Ancient tribe

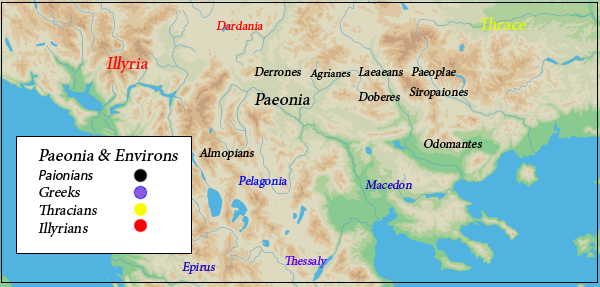
Paeonia, tribes and environs

The Odomanti (Ancient Greek: Ὀδόμαντοι, romanized: Odómantoi) or Odomantes (Ancient Greek: Ὀδόμαντες, romanized: Odómantes) were an ancient Balkan tribe. Some regard it as Paeonian, while others claim, that the tribe was with certainty Thracian. The Odomanti are noted by Herodotus, Thucydides, Stephanus of Byzantium and Pliny the Elder.

The district which they occupied, was called after them, Odomantice (Ancient Greek: Ὀδομαντική) and Odomantis (Ancient Greek: Ὀδομαντίς). The tribe were settled upon the whole of the great mountain Orbelus, extending along the northeast of the lower Strymonic plain, from about Melnik (Bulgaria) and Sidirokastro (Greece) to Zikhne inclusive, where they bordered on Pangaion, the gold and silver mines of which they worked with the Pieres and Satrae. (Herod. l. c.) Secure in their inaccessible position, they defied Megabazus. (Herod. v. 16.) The northwest portion of their territory lay to the right of Sitalces as he crossed Mount Cercine; and their general situation agrees with the description of Thucydides (ii. 101), according to whom they dwelt beyond the Strymon to the north, that is to say, to the north of the Lower Strymon, where, alone, the river takes such a course to the east as to justify the expression. Cleon invited Polles, their chieftain, to join him with as many Thracian mercenaries as could be levied. (Thuc. v. 6; Aristoph. Acharn. 156, 164; Suid. s. v. ἀποτεθρίακεν; Leake, Northern Greece, vol. iii. pp. 210, 306, 465.) During the Roman period, most of their land belonged to the territory ("chora") of the ancient city of Sirra, today Serres, in the eastern part of modern Central Macedonia, Greece.

== See also ==
- Peltast
- Paionia
