= The Legend of Diyes =

Story of migration of Thracian tribe

The Legend of Diyes is the story of the northward migration of the Thracian tribe Dii to the country of Odin. The Dii initially lived in the foothills of the Rhodope Mountains in Thrace.
