= Dersaei =

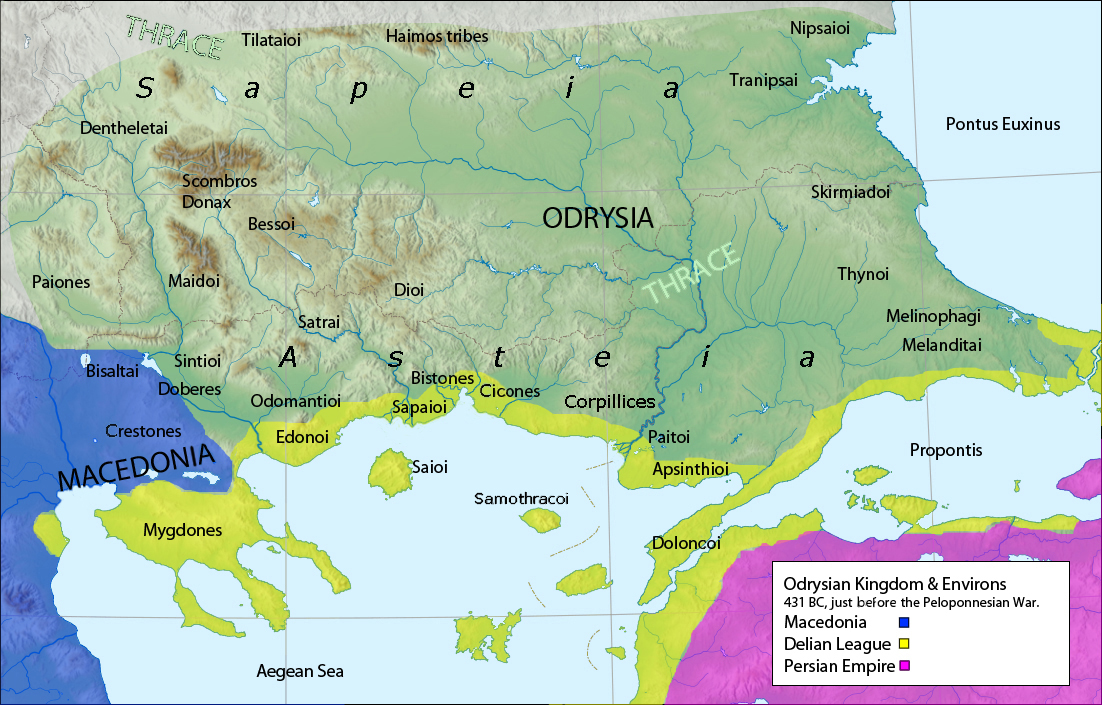
Map showing the approximate location of the Sapaeans and the Edoni. The Dersaei were situated between them.

Dersaei (Greek: Δερσαῖοι) was a Thracian tribe that lived somewhere near the Sapaeans and the Edoni. They are mentioned by Herodotus. They were allied with the Maedi tribe against the Getae during their campaign with the Romans in 75 BC. The Thracian chthonic deity Derzelas is likely associated with the name of the Dersaei.
