= Iamphorina =

Iamphorina or Iamphorynna was the capital of the Maedi, a Thracian tribe in ancient Macedonia. Stephanus of Byzantium, citing Diodorus, has the name as Phorunna or Phorounna (Ancient Greek: Φόρουννα). It was taken by Philip V of Macedon in 211 BCE. Writing in the 19th century, William Martin Leake placed it at Ivorina (Vrania), in the upper valley of the Morava River. Although, per modern scholars it is unlocated, per Aleksandar Fol it was located near the village of Dragovishtitsa, Kyustendil Province, whose old name was Yamborano.
