= Bessi =

Ancient Thracian tribe

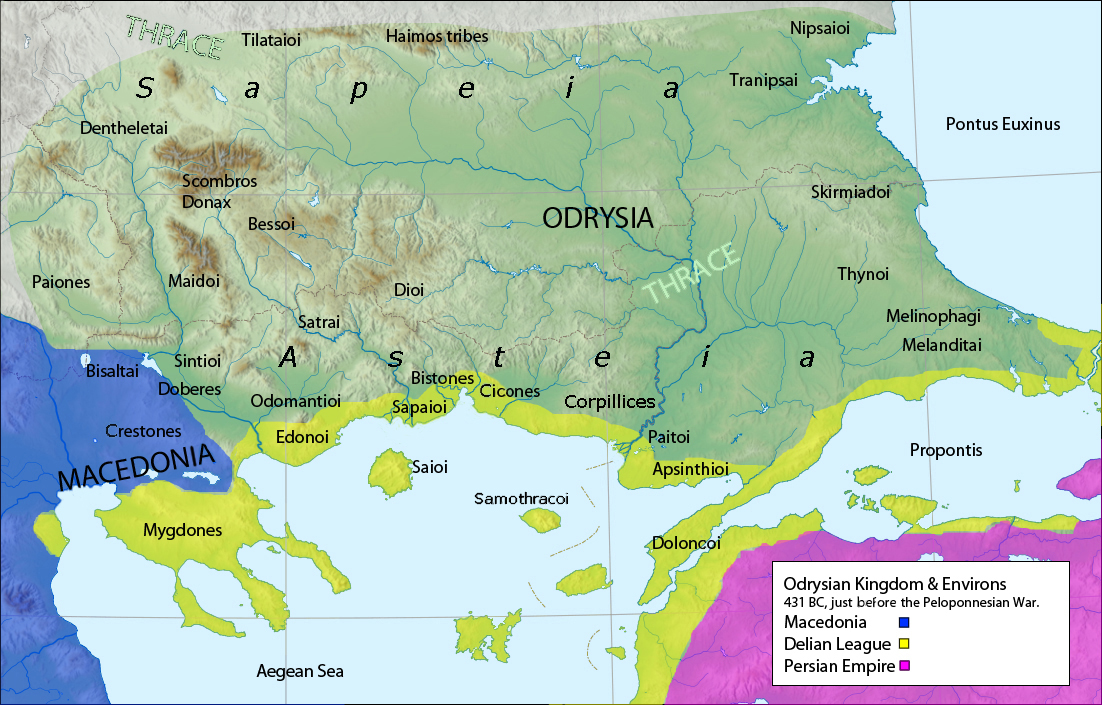
The regional location of the Bessi, in the Rhodope and North-West of the Dii tribe.

The Bessi (/ˈbɛsaɪ/; Ancient Greek: Βῆσσοι, Bēssoi or Βέσσοι, Béssoi) or Bessae, were a Thracian tribe that inhabited the upper valley of the Hebros and the lands between the Haemus and Rhodope mountain ranges in historical Thrace.

== Geography ==
The exact geographic location of the Bessi is still unclear. According to Herodotus, the Bessi occupied the highest summits of the Satrae in south-western Thrace, while Polybius alludes to the Bessi as having been situated on the plains between the Dentheletae and Odrysians. The geographic extent of the Bessi is further expanded upon by Strabo in his Geographica, where he states that the Bessi inhabited a land beginning near the source of the Hébros and encompassing the highlands between the Haemus and Rhodope mountain ranges that bordered the Paeonians and Illyrian Autariatae and Dardani to the west. Strabo also places the Bessi as bordering the Odrysians and Sapaeans. There are also indications that the Bessi gradually came to settle the lowlands between the Hébros and Tonsus near Philippopolis and modern Pazardzhik, consequently expanding eastwards near Beroe.

In light of archaeological and epigraphic evidence, modern scholars have formulated a number of theories on the location of the lands associated with the Bessi during the period of Roman imperialism - known as Bessica. The first major paradigm, originally advanced by Gavril Katsarov, largely coincided with ancient accounts although was later expanded by Georgi Mihailov to also coincide with Philippopolis and the surrounding environs located to the east of the Bessi core, as well as including the area around modern Yakoruda to the south. The paradigm would then maintain that, during the reign of Trajan, the territory would come to be administratively incorporated into Philippopolis as a consequence of the emperor's urbanizing projects in Thrace. On the other hand, Margarita Tacheva proposed that Roman Bessica had no civic centre and was based around the Rhodope, Rila, and Strandzha mountains. She then argues that the region was administratively attached to Philippopolis during the reign of Vespasian, later being divided and absorbed into the administrative units of Scupi, Serdica, and Philippopolis under Trajan. While these two paradigms dominate academia, a third theory presented by Peter Delev puts forth that Bessica was centred on the northern foothills of the Rila mountain range and was located outside of the Rhodopes.

== History ==
According to Herodotus, the Bessi were a sub-tribe or branch of the Satrae intimately tied to the cult of Dionysus and responsible for interpreting the prophetic utterances of the prophetess at the deity's sanctuary, located on the highest summits of the land inhabited by the tribe. This prophetic role of the Bessi in the cult has led many scholars to suggest that they may have initially represented a priestly-caste within the greater Satrae tribal group, and that membership into the community was intrinsically entwined with their cultic role and maintenance of the sanctuary of Dionysus.

In c. 340 BCE, the Macedonian generals Antipater and Parmenion are noted as having conducted military campaigns in the lands of the Tetrachoritai as a part of Philip II of Macedon's subjugation of various Thracian polities. The aforementioned tribal group was believed by Strabo to have been the same as that of the Bessi, which he also refers to by the name of Tetrakomai. According to a modern reading of the sources, however, it is possible that the Tetrachoritai and other Thracian groups associated with the Bessi were originally smaller tribes that later became a part of a Bessian-led tribal conglomerate, on the other hand, it is also possible that the tribal designation of Bessi (and its variations) later came to bear no true ethnic meaning and was applied by classical sources to a range of different Thracian tribes inhabiting the highlands of south-western Thrace. Likewise, the Dii are believed to be related to the Bessi as Pliny the Elder records the ethnonym Diobessoi. Later in 184 or 183 BCE, the Bessi appear as among the Thracian tribes that were attacked by Philip V of Macedon. The Macedonian king had managed to push into the valley of the Hébros and captured Philippopolis, installing a garrison which was later driven out by the Odrysians.

The Bessi would achieve their greatest prominence in the historical record in their conflicts with the expanding Roman state and the formation of Roman Macedonia in 146 BCE. Between the years 106 and 100 BCE, the Bessi would come into armed conflict with the consul Marcus Minucius Rufus who was distinguished in his campaigns against the Thracians, to the point in which the people of Delphi erected an equestrian statue in his honour. The statue bore a bilingual inscription which outlined the consul's victory against the Celtic Scordisci and "Bessi and the rest of the Thracians" (pros Bessous [k]ai tous loipous Thrai[kas]). A virtually identical statue is also noted as having been erected in Europus. The disparate locations of these statues suggests that the conflict was geographically broad and also attests to the military mobility of the Bessi, the inscriptions also present a change in the presentation of the Bessi, who are depicted as the most notable among the Thracians. In 72 BCE, following the retreat of Mithridates VI Eupator and his forces to Bithynia, Thrace was assigned to the proconsul of Macedonia, Marcus Terentius Varro Lucullus, who initiated a campaign against the Thracians and subjugated the Bessi, occupying the settlement of Uscudama – one of the Bessian tribal centres. In 29–8 BCE, the sacred sanctuary of Dionysus was taken from the Bessi by Marcus Licinius Crassus and given to the Odrysians, rivals of the Bessi and allies of the Romans. In response, the priest Vologaesus rallied the Bessi in c. 15–1 BCE, and managed to win a number of military victories against the Odrysian nobles Rhascyporis and Rhoemetacles. This conflict further supports the thesis that the identity of the Bessi prior to complete Roman subjugation was strongly linked and rooted to the sanctuary of Dionysus, and that their rivalry with the neighbouring pro-Roman Thracians strengthened this tribal and geographic identity. According to Appian, the Bessi surrendered themselves to Augustus.

As a result of their opposition to the Romans, there was a shift in the depiction of the Bessi which emphasised their war-like and predatory natures. As such, Strabo refers to the tribe as being "called brigands even by the brigands". The stereotypical image of the Bessi would also become representative for all natives of Thrace as a whole, as is evidenced by a second century CE mural painting from Valentia, Hispania Tarraconensis, which depicts a Bessian woman next to other peoples exotic to the Romans. The ethnonym of the Bessi became less associated with the core tribe and their original geographic location, it became an identity that was readily abstracted onto the inhabitants of the south-eastern Balkans.

As a result of their conflicts with the Romans, a portion of the Bessi were forcibly resettled in the region of Dobruja, with the poet Ovid noting a community of Bessi living near Tomis. Epigraphic analysis attests to around 40–50 individuals bearing the ethnonym of Bessi or Bessus in the Roman imperial navy, while 22 appear in the auxiliary land forces, 5–7 in the equites singulares Augusti, and even less in the Praetorian Guard. One explanation for the significant presence of the Bessi in the navy maintains that they were from the branch that had been resettled in Dobruja and thus had become accustomed to sailing; however, the fact that the Bessian sailors did not reach high ranks within the navy suggests that they likely had no prior experience in seafaring. Thus, it is possible that the presence of the Bessi can simply be attributed to a larger population size during the time of mass recruitment under Nero and Domitian, the latter of which was preparing for a war in Dacia. However, traditional scholarship has argued that during the Roman period Bessi became a synonym for all Thracians living south of the Danube and thus the tribal name did not bear an ethnic meaning. Hence why the Byzantine author Kekaumenos wrote that the Vlachs stem from the Dacians and Bessi who had migrated from their homeland between the Danube and Sava, and into Epirus, Macedonia, and Hellas.

The name Bessi and its related variations appear across the Balkans, particularly during the Roman period. Bessus is attested among the ancient locals of the area around modern Pljevlja and Prijepolje. It also appears in the Roman veteran legionary settlements of Scupi (Colonia Flavia Aelia Scupi) and Aprus (Colonia Claudia Apri). In Dacia it appears in several sites, including Sarmizegetusa Regia, Banatska Palanka, and Apulum.

== Christianization ==
Towards the end of the 4th century, Nicetas, the Bishop of Remesiana in Dacia Mediterranea, brought Christianity to "those mountain wolves", the Bessi. Reportedly his mission was successful, and the worship of Dionysus and other Thracian gods was eventually replaced by Christianity.

In 570, Antoninus Placentius wrote that in the valleys of Mount Sinai there was a monastery in which the monks spoke Greek, Latin, Syriac, Egyptian and Bessian. The origin of the monasteries is explained in a mediaeval hagiography written by Simeon Metaphrastes, in Vita Sancti Theodosii Coenobiarchae in which he wrote that Saint Theodosius founded on the shore of the Dead Sea a monastery with four churches, in each being spoken a different language, among which Bessan was found. The place where the monasteries were founded was called "Cutila", which may be a Thracian name.

== Schramm's hypothesis ==
German historian Gottfried Schramm speculated that the Albanians derived from the Christianized Bessi, after their remnants were allegedly pushed by Slavs and Bulgars during the 9th century westwards into today Albania, while mainstream historians support Illyrian-Albanian relation. Archaeologically, there is absolutely no evidence of a 9th-century migration of any population, such as the Bessi, from western Bulgaria to Albania.

Also according to historical linguistics the Thracian-Bessian hypothesis of the origin of Albanian should be rejected, since only very little comparative linguistic material is available (the Thracian is attested only marginally, while the Bessian is completely unknown), but at the same time the individual phonetic history of Albanian and Thracian clearly indicates a very different sound development that cannot be considered as the result of one language. Furthermore, the Christian vocabulary of Albanian is mainly Latin, which speaks against the construct of a "Bessian church language". The elite of the Bessi tribe was gradually Hellenized. Low level of borrowings from Greek in the Albanian language is a further argument against the identification of Albanian with the Bessi. Also the dialectal division of the Albanian-speaking area in the Early Middle Ages contradicts the alleged migration of Albanians in the hinterland of Dyrrhachium in the first decades of the 9th century AD, especially because the dialectal division of a linguistic space is in general a result of a number of linguistic phenomena occurring during a considerable span of time and requires a very large number of natural speakers.

== See also ==
- Dii
- Satrae
- Haemus Mons

== Bibliography ==
- Demiraj, Bardhyl (2010). "Gli insediamenti degli albanesi nell'alto medioevo" (PDF). In Gianni Belluscio; Antonino Mendicino (eds.). Scritti in onore di Eric Pratt Hamp per il suo 90 compleanno. Rende: Università della Calabria. pp. 73–83.
- (in Romanian) Lozovan, Eugen, Dacia Sacră, Editura Saeculum, București, 2005.
- (in French) Peeters, Paul, "La version ibéro-arménienne de l'autobiographie de Denys l'Aréopagite", Analecta Bollandiana 39, 1921, p. 288-290.
- Wilkes, John, The Illyrians, 1982, p. 84.
