= Satrae =

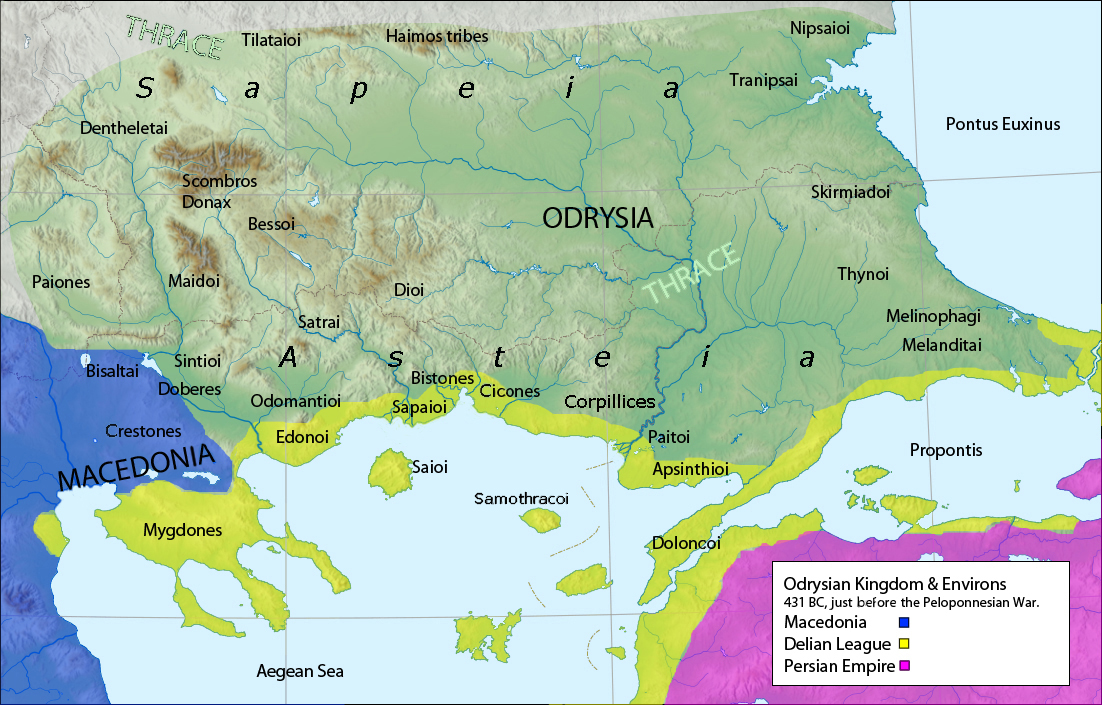
Approximate location of the Satrai

The Satrae (Greek: "Σάτραι") were, in ancient geography, a Thracian people, inhabiting part of Mount Pangaeus between the rivers Nestus (Mesta) and Strymon (Struma). According to Herodotus, they were independent in his time, and had never been conquered within the memory of man. They dwelt on lofty mountains covered with forests and snow, and on the highest of these was an oracle of Dionysus, whose utterances were delivered by a priestess.

They were the chief workers of the gold and silver mines in the district. Herodotus is the only ancient writer who mentions the Satrae, and Wilhelm Tomaschek regards the name not as that of a people but of the warlike nobility among the Thracian Dii and Bessi.

J. E. Harrison identifies them with the Satyri (Satyrs), the attendants and companions of Dionysus in his revels, and also with the Centaurs. The name Satrokentae, a Thracian tribe according to Hecataeus (quoted in Stephanus of Byzantium), seems to support the second identification.

The Greek Histories of Herodotus named the Satrae as a part of the Thrace tribes which lived in the Nestus and Strymin Valley (Book, VIO, 110), "have continued living in freedom" till his time, and "dwell on high mountains covered with forests of all kinds and snow, and they are excellent warriors". Here, they "possess the place of divination sacred to Dionysus is in their highest mountains", questioning an oracle like the one of Delphi.
