= Coreli =

Thracian tribe

Koreli or Coreli is the name of a Thracian tribe. They are mentioned by Livy.

== See also ==
- List of Thracian tribes
