= Artakioi =

Past Moesian tribe

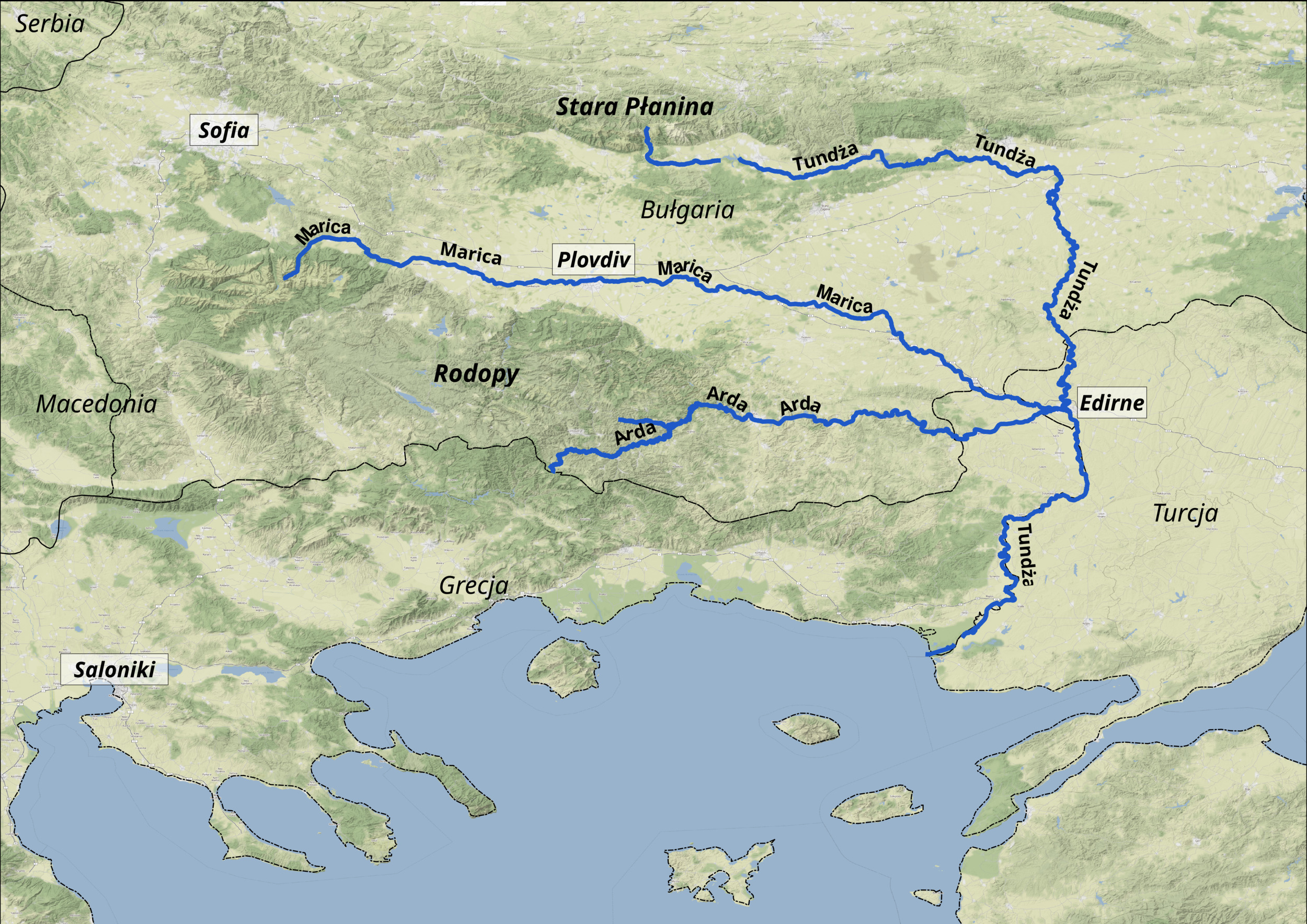
The region of upper Tundzha river inhabited by the Artakioi

Artakioi was a Moesian tribe mentioned in the Roman period. Cassius Dio (155–235) mentioned the tribe. The ethnonym has been connected with the Roman-era toponyms Artiskos (a tributary of the Maritsa) and Artanes (a tributary of the Danube). The tribe inhabited the region of the upper Tundzha river, a tributary of Maritsa. It is believed that they spoke a Thracian language.

== See also ==
- List of ancient tribes in Thrace and Dacia
