= Predasenses =

Dacian tribe

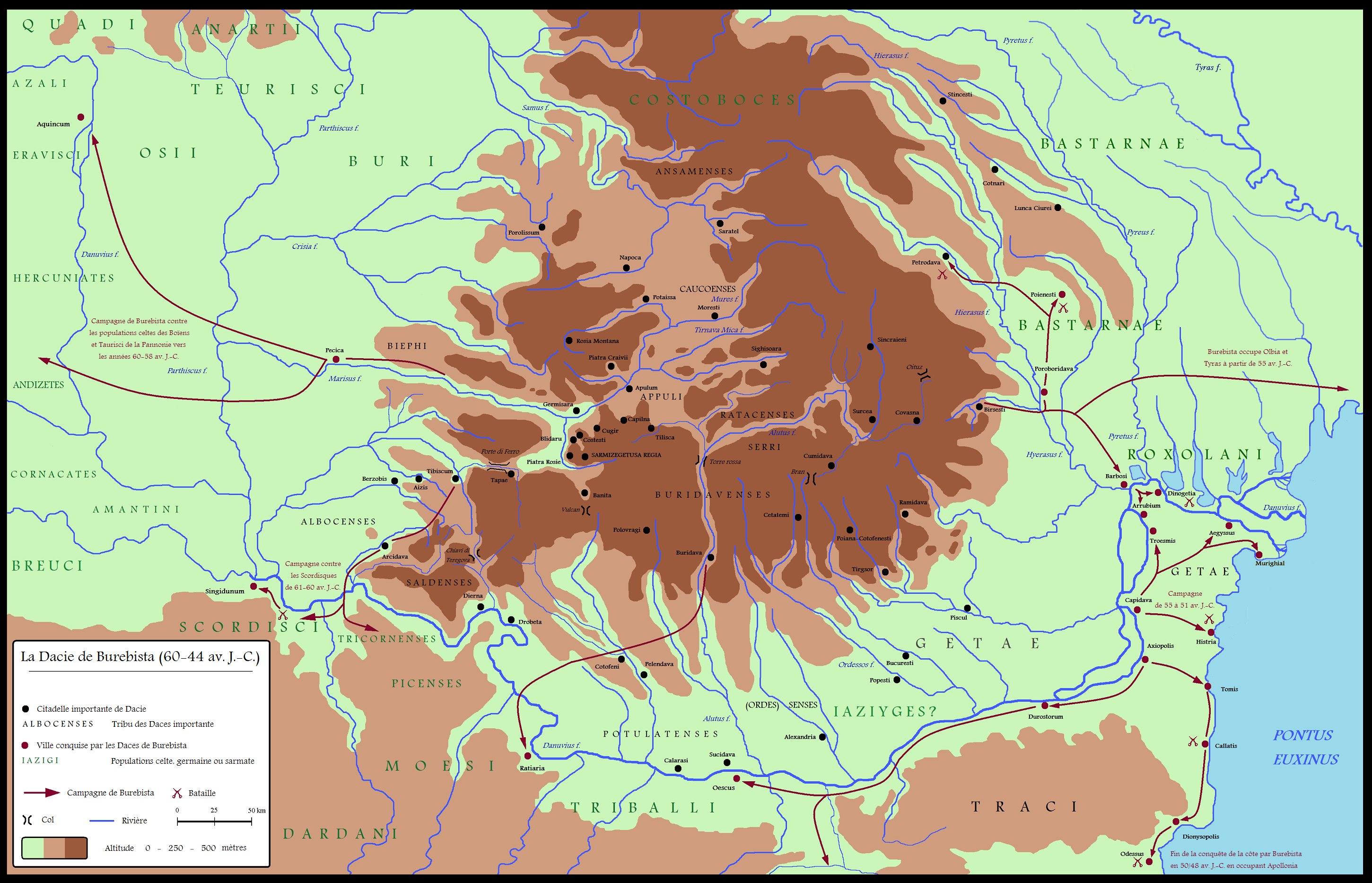
Dacian tribes.

The Predasenses or Predavenses were a Dacian tribe.

== See also ==
- List of ancient cities in Thrace and Dacia
