= Pieria =

Pieria may refer to:

- Pieria (constituency), in Greece
- Pieria (regional unit) in Greece
- Pieria (Syria), a province of Roman Syria
- Pieria (mythology), the wife of Danaus
- Pieria (Thessaly), ancient city of Thessaly
- Pieria (Greek myth), several mythological figures
- The Pieria albedo feature on Mercury
- The 'albedo name' of the Mercury region now known as the Derain quadrangle
- Pierian Mountains, a mountain range

== See also ==
- Pieres
