= Corpili =

Thracian tribe

Korpiloi (Greek: Κορπίλοι) or Corpili is the name of a Thracian tribe that was located below the Brenae.

== See also ==
- Thracian tribes
