= Trixae =

Dacian tribe

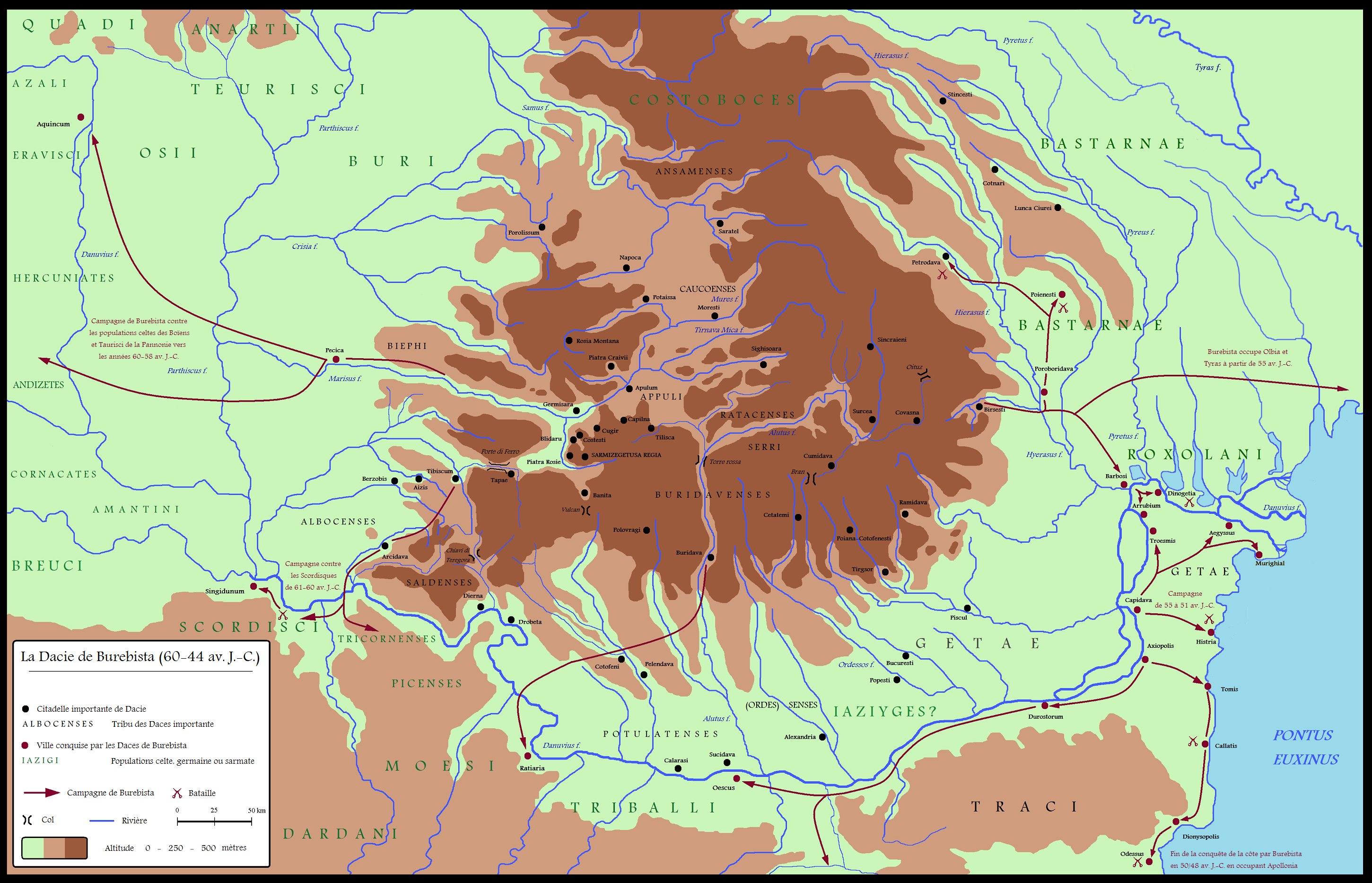
Dacian tribes.

Trixae was a Dacian tribe.

== See also ==
- List of ancient cities in Thrace and Dacia
