= Terizi =

Thracian Getic tribe

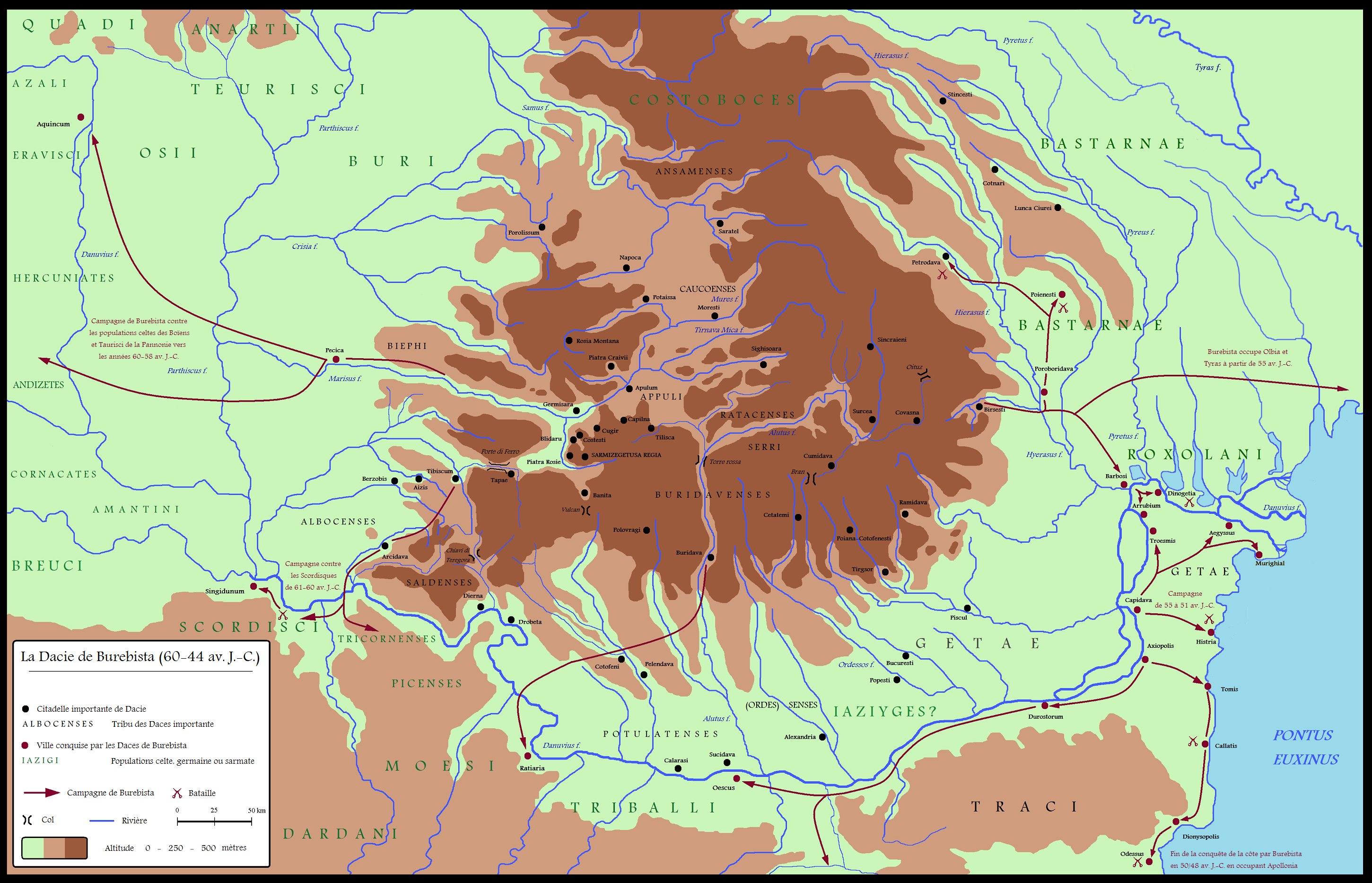
Dacian tribes.

The Terizi (Ancient Greek: Τέριζοι) were a Thracian Getic tribe. The Terizi lived on the Tirizian promontory (now known as Cape Kaliakra).

In 313 BCE, the Terizi were defeated by the Hellenistic strategos of Thrace, Lysimachus, who established a treasury on the coast of the Black Sea, in their territory.

== See also ==
- List of ancient cities in Thrace and Dacia
