= Apuli =

Dacian tribe

The Apuli or Biefi were a Dacian tribe centered at the Dacian town Apulon (Latin Apulum) near what is now Alba Iulia in Transylvania, Romania.

Apuli has clear resemblance to Apulia, the ancient southeastern Italy region, which is believed to have been settled by Illyrian tribes (also named Apuli or Iapyges).

Linguists use it as an example for the similarities between Illyrian and Dacian language.

== See also ==
- Dacia
- List of ancient tribes in Thrace and Dacia
- Thraco-Illyrian
