= Pia Laviosa Zambotti =

Italian archaeologist (1898–1965)

Pia Laviosa Zambotti (25 January 1898, in Fondo – 10 November 1965, in Milan) was an Italian archaeologist, who specialised in Indo-European studies, Nordic folklore, and Finno-Ugric cultures.
