= Apulon =

Dacian fortress city in Romania

- Dacian Fortress of Piatra Craivii, Dacian Settlement of Piatra Craivii
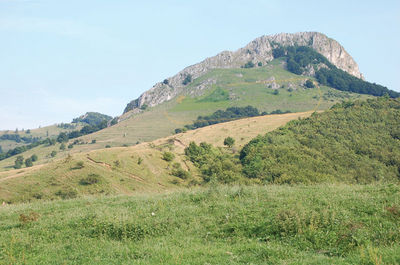
- Piatra Craivii

- Location within Romania
- 46.209122°N 23.485422°E
- Cultures: Apuli
- Location: Piatra Craivii, Craiva, Alba County, Romania

History
- Event: Trajan's Dacian Wars

Site notes
- Elevation: 1,010 m (3,310 ft)

Monument istoric
- Reference no.: AB-I-s-A-00028

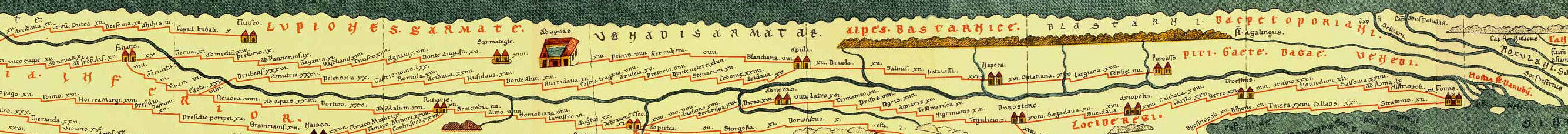
Apula on the Roman Dacia selection from Tabula Peutingeriana

Apulon (or Apoulon) was a Dacian fortress city close to modern Alba Iulia, Romania. The Latin name of Apulum is derived. The exact location is believed by many archaeologists to be the Dacian fortifications on top of Piatra Craivii, Craiva, Cricău, about 20 km north of Alba-Iulia.

Apulon was an important Dacian political, economic and social center, the capital of the Apuli tribe. It was first mentioned by the Ancient Greek geographer Ptolemy in his Geographia, under the name Apulon. It is also depicted in the Tabula Peutingeriana as an important city named Apula, at the cross road of two main routes: one coming from Blandiana, the other from Acidava. The two roads merge at Apula, with the next stop on the route being Brucla.

After the southern part of Dacia became a province of the Roman Empire, the capital of the Dacia Apulensis district was established here, and the city was known as Apulum. Apulum was one of the largest centers in Roman Dacia and the seat of the XIII Gemina Legion. The castra at Apulum is the largest in Romania, occupying 37,5 ha (750 x 500 m^{2}).

== Gallery ==
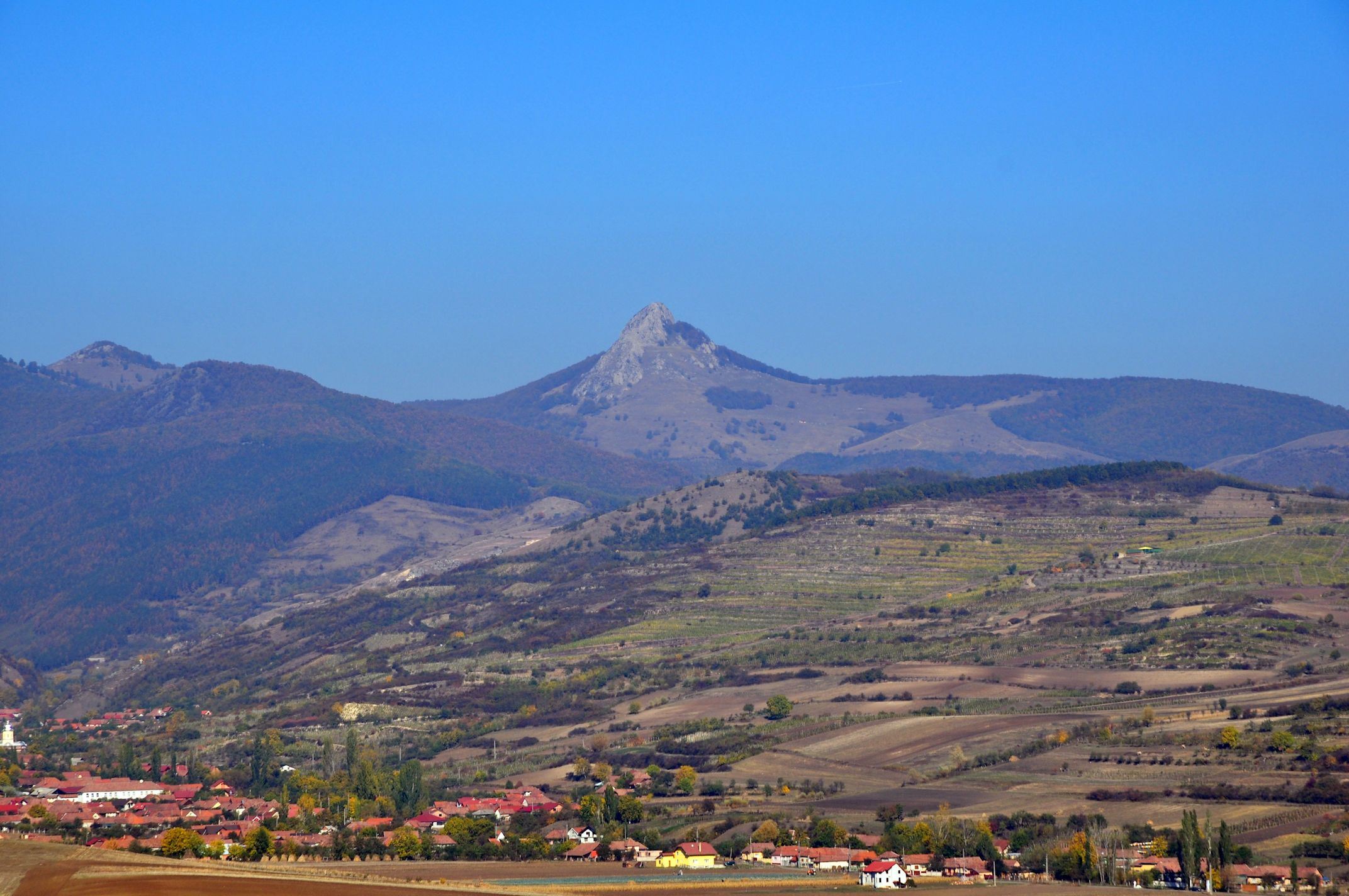
View from Măgulici Hill, Ighiu

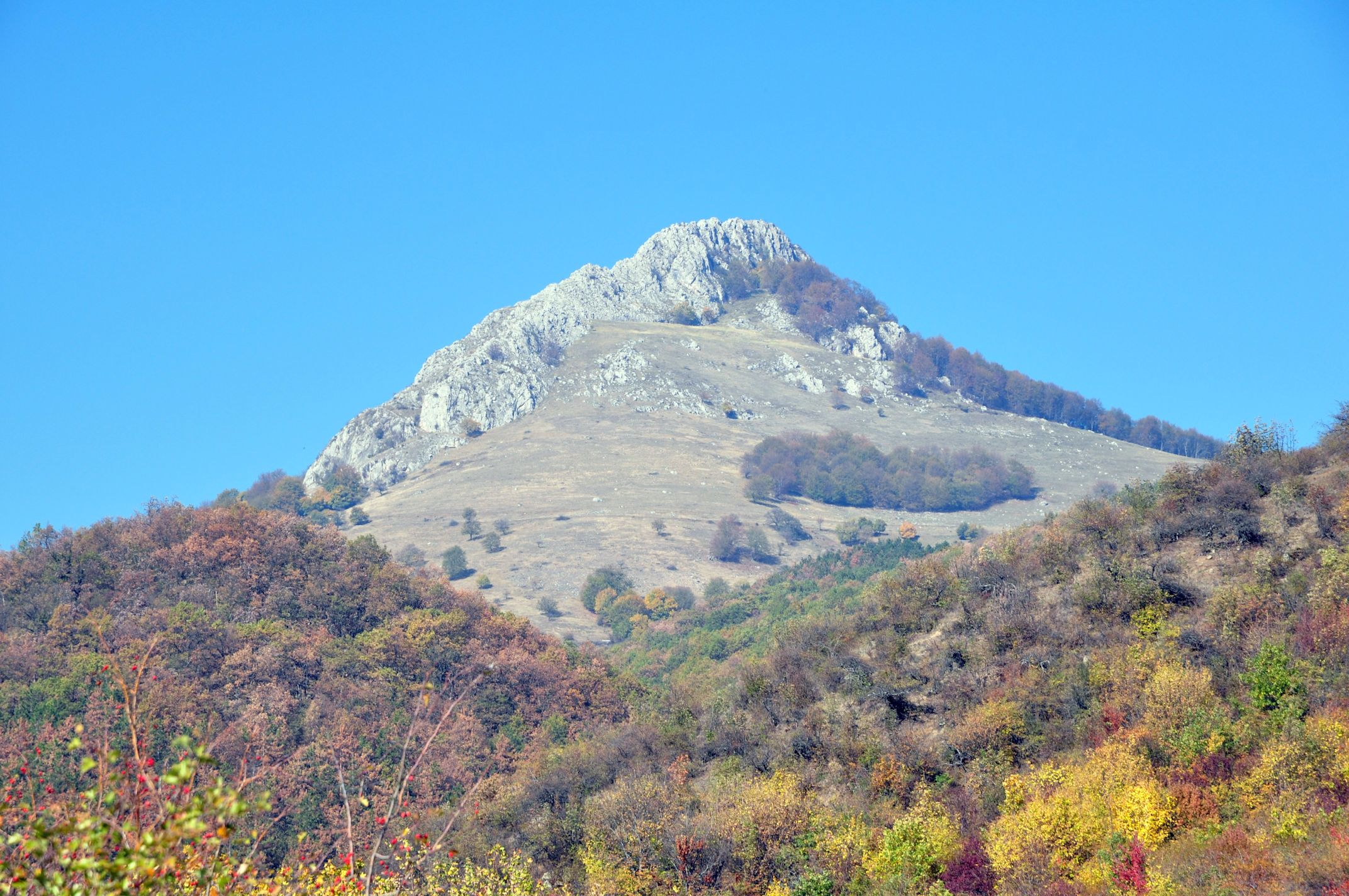
View from Craiva's valley

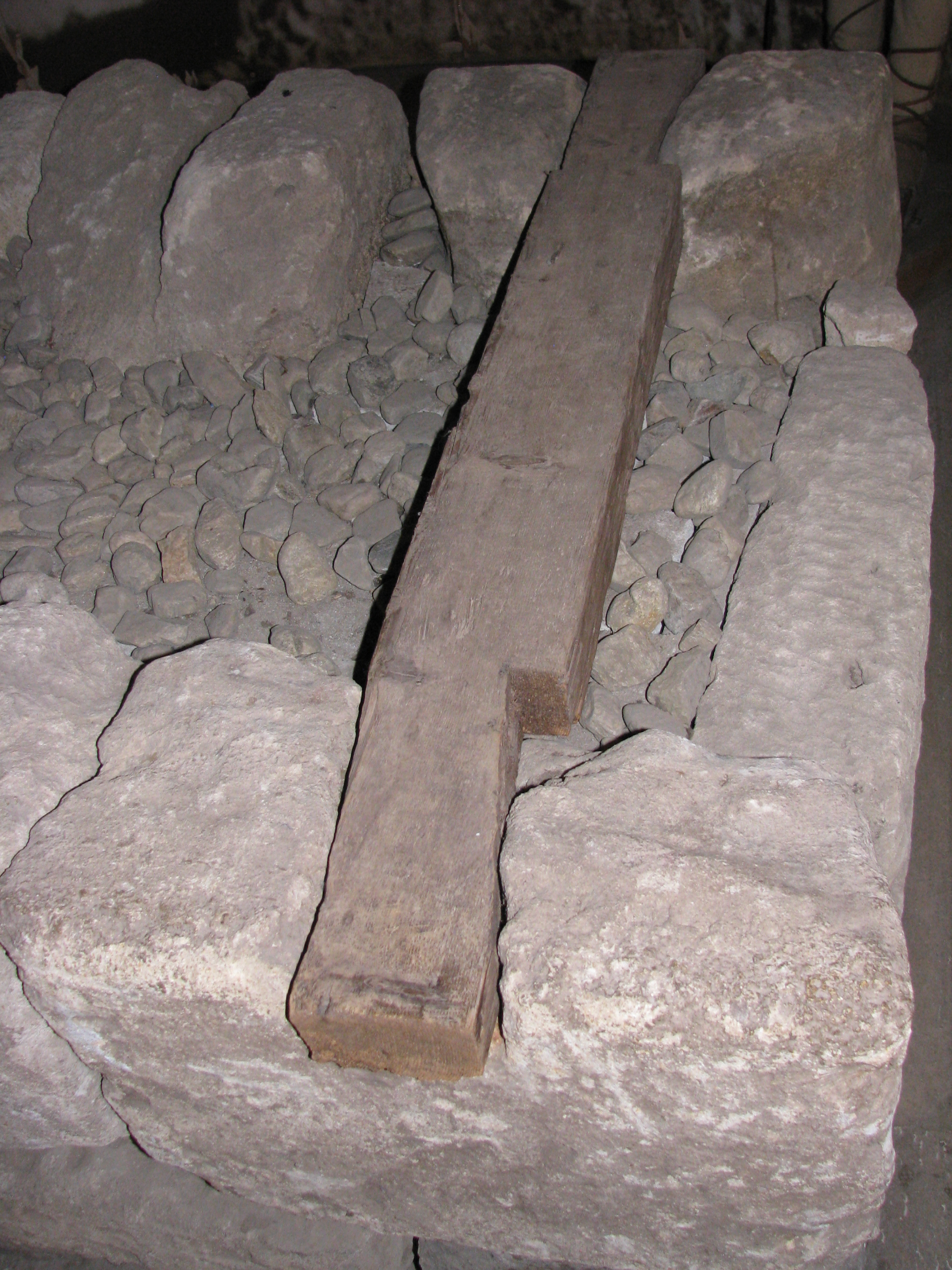
Wall from Piatra Craivii Dacian Fortress in display at the National Museum of the Union, Alba Iulia

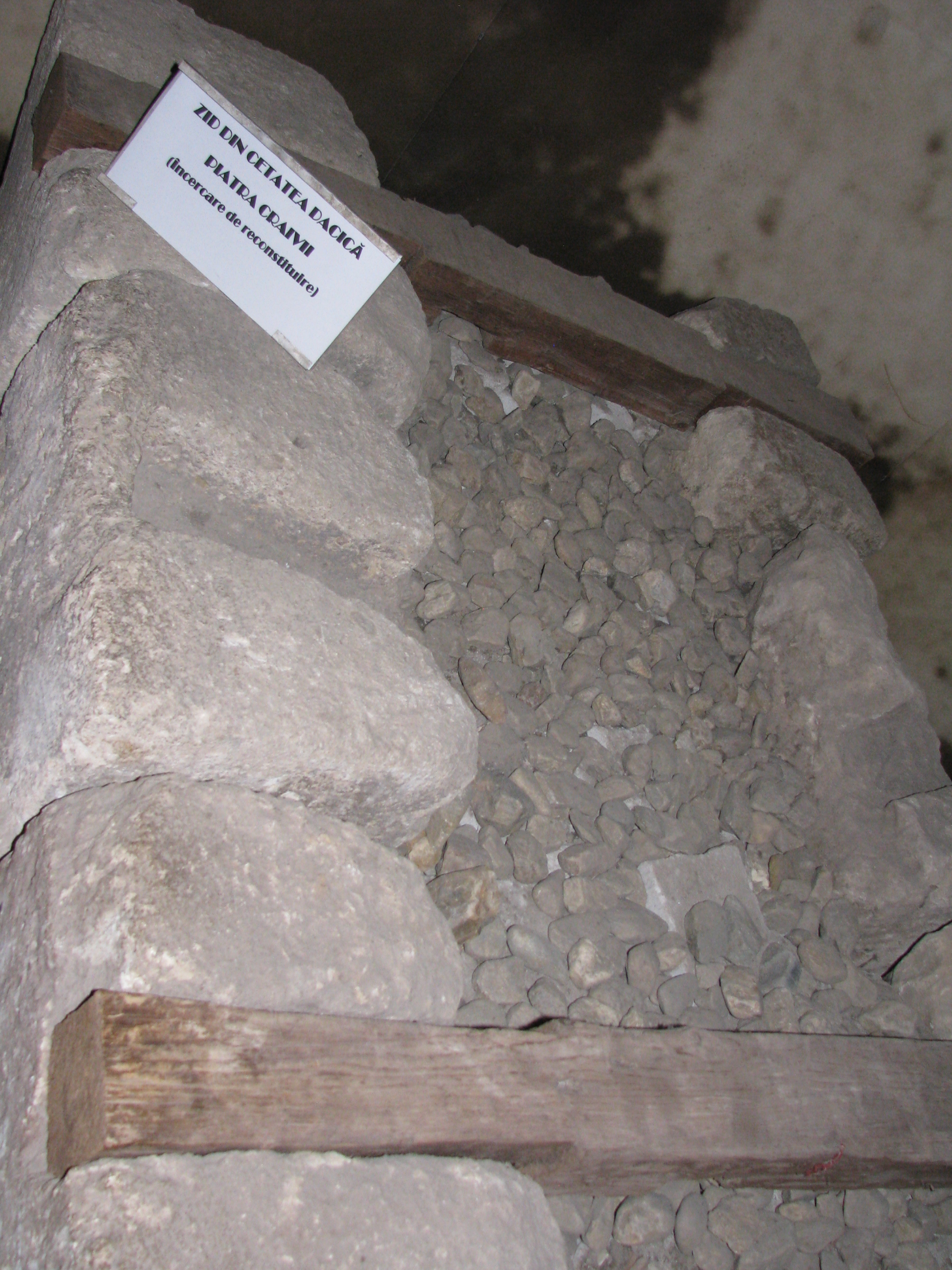
Wall from Piatra Craivii Dacian Fortress

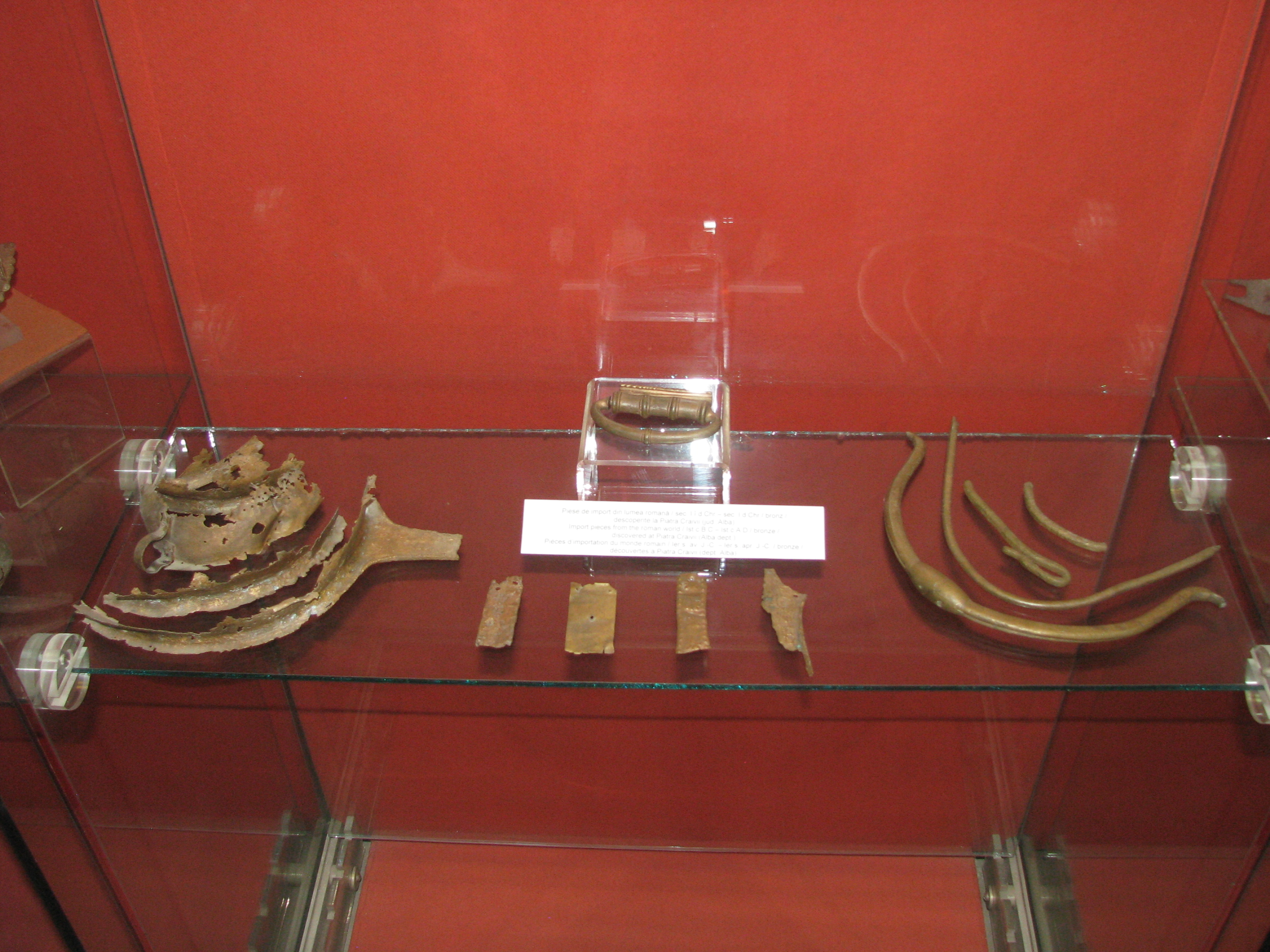
Import items from the Roman world found at Dacian settlement of Piatra Craivii,

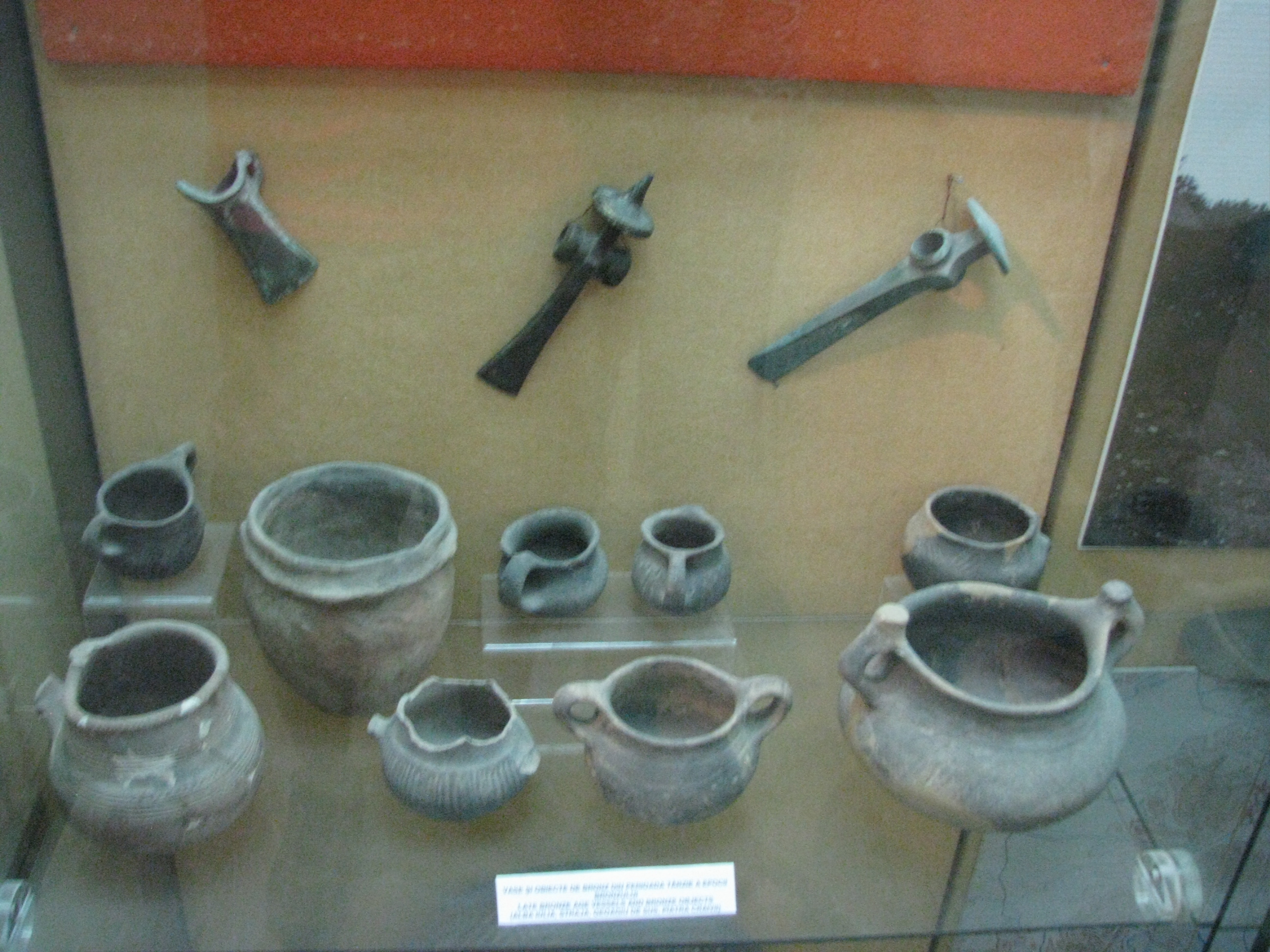
Late Bronze Age vessels and bronze objects, from various locations in Alba County, including Piatra Craivii

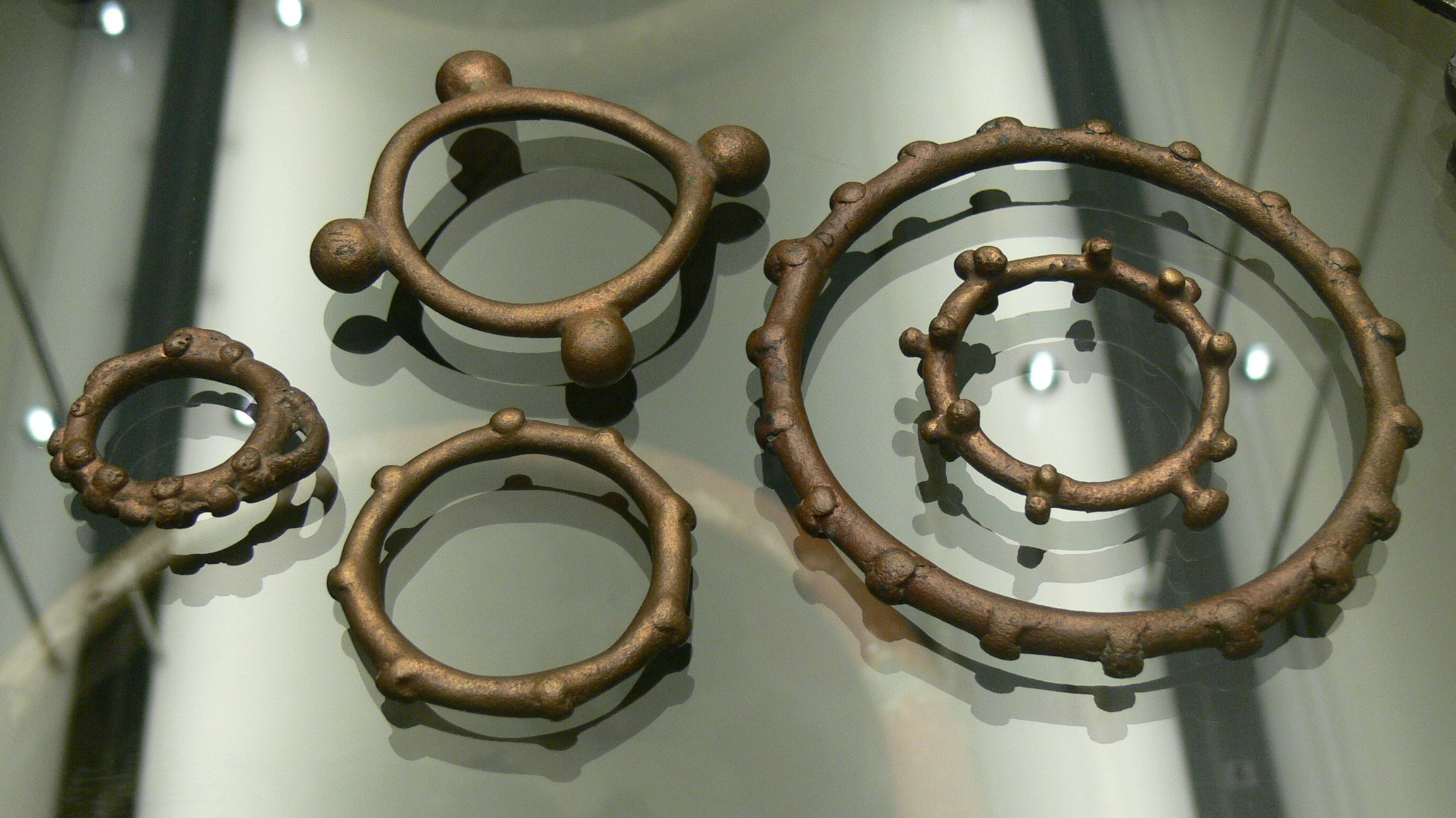
Dacian bronze rings (1st century BC) found on site - on display in the Roman Museum Manching.

== See also ==
- Dacia
- Roman Dacia
- List of ancient cities in Thrace and Dacia
