= Wilhelm Tomaschek =

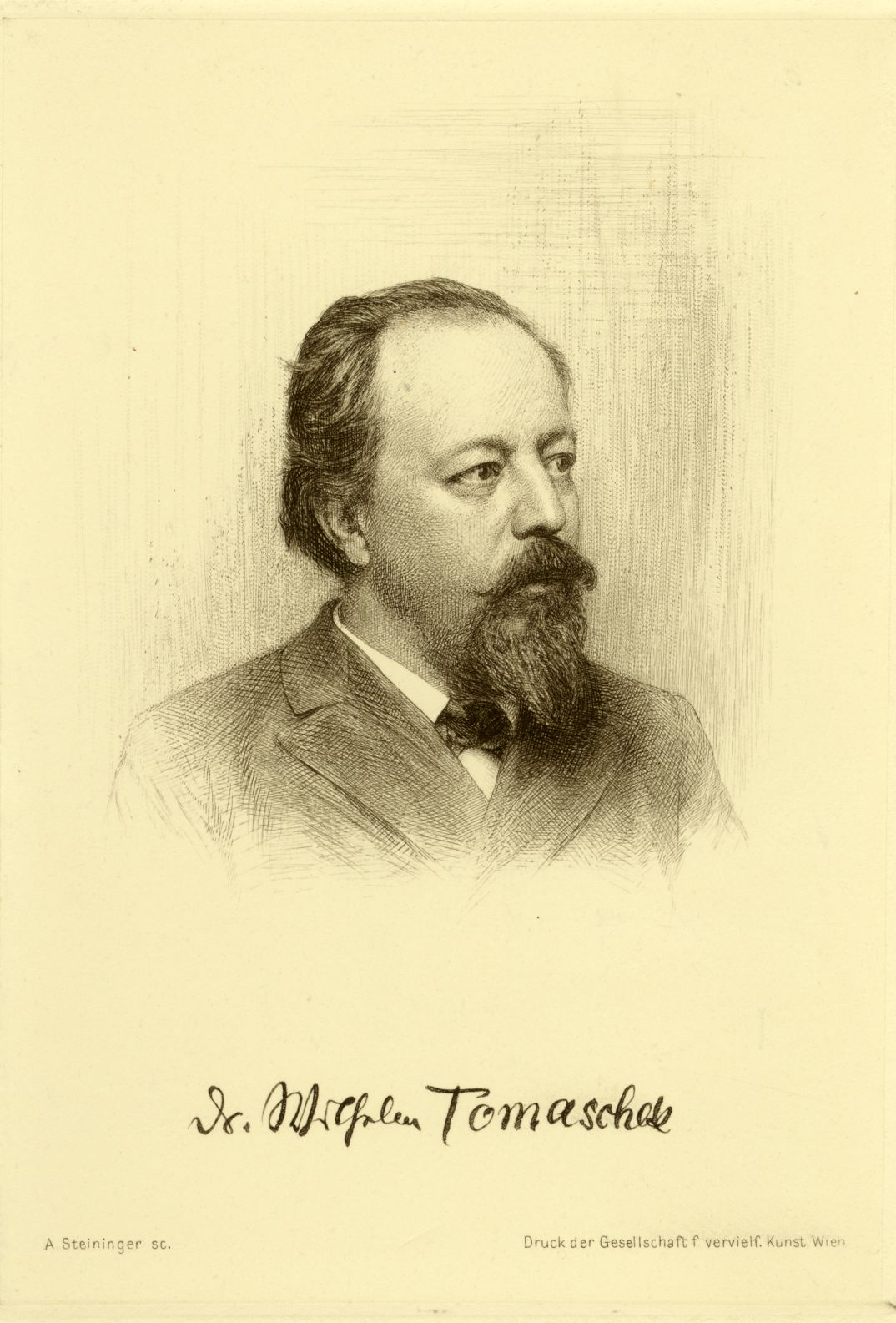
Wilhelm Tomaschek

Wilhelm Tomaschek (Czech: Vilém Tomášek; 26 May 1841 – 9 September 1901) was a Czech-Austrian geographer and orientalist. He is known for his work in the fields of historical topography and historical ethnography.

== Biography ==
Wilhelm Tomasche was born on 26 May 1841 in Olomouc in Moravia. He received his education at the University of Vienna (1860–1864). Afterwards he worked as a teacher in gymnasiums at Sankt Pölten and Vienna. On the strength of the first volume of Centralasiatische Studien, he was named an associate professor of geography at the University of Graz in 1877. In 1881 he attained the rank of full professor, and in 1885, was appointed chair of historical geography at the University of Vienna. In 1899 he became a regular member of the Vienna Academy of Sciences.

In 1933 the thoroughfare Tomaschekstraße, in the district of Floridsdorf (Vienna), was named in his honor.

== Literary works ==
- Centralasiatische Studien. I. Sogdiana, 1877 – Central Asian studies; Sogdiana.
- Centralasiatische Studien. II. Die Pamir-Dialekte, 1880 – Central Asian studies; Pamir dialects.
- Zur historischen Topographie von Persien. I. Die Straßenzüge der tabula Peutingeriana, 1883 – Historical topography of Persia, The streets of Tabula Peutingeriana.
- Zur historischen Topographie von Persien. II. Die Wege durch die Persische Wüste, 1885 – Historical topography of Persia. II. Routes through the Persian desert.
- Zur historischen Topographie von Kleinasien im Mittelalter, 1891 – Historical topography of Asia Minor in the Middle Ages.
- Die alten Thraker. Eine ethnologische Untersuchung. 3 volumes. Vienna: Tempsky, 1893–1894 – The ancient Thracians. An ethnographic study.
