= Diobesi =

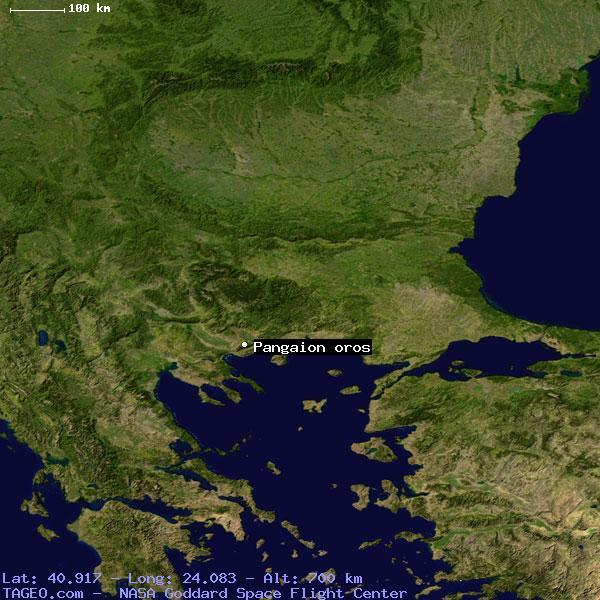
Mount Pangaion at the bottom of which the Diobesi lived alongside the Thracian Eleti and Carbilesi

Diobesi was a Thracian tribe that lived on the foothills of mount Pangaion. They are mentioned by Pliny the Elder.

== See also ==
- List of Thracian tribes
