= Saldenses =

Ancient Dacian tribe

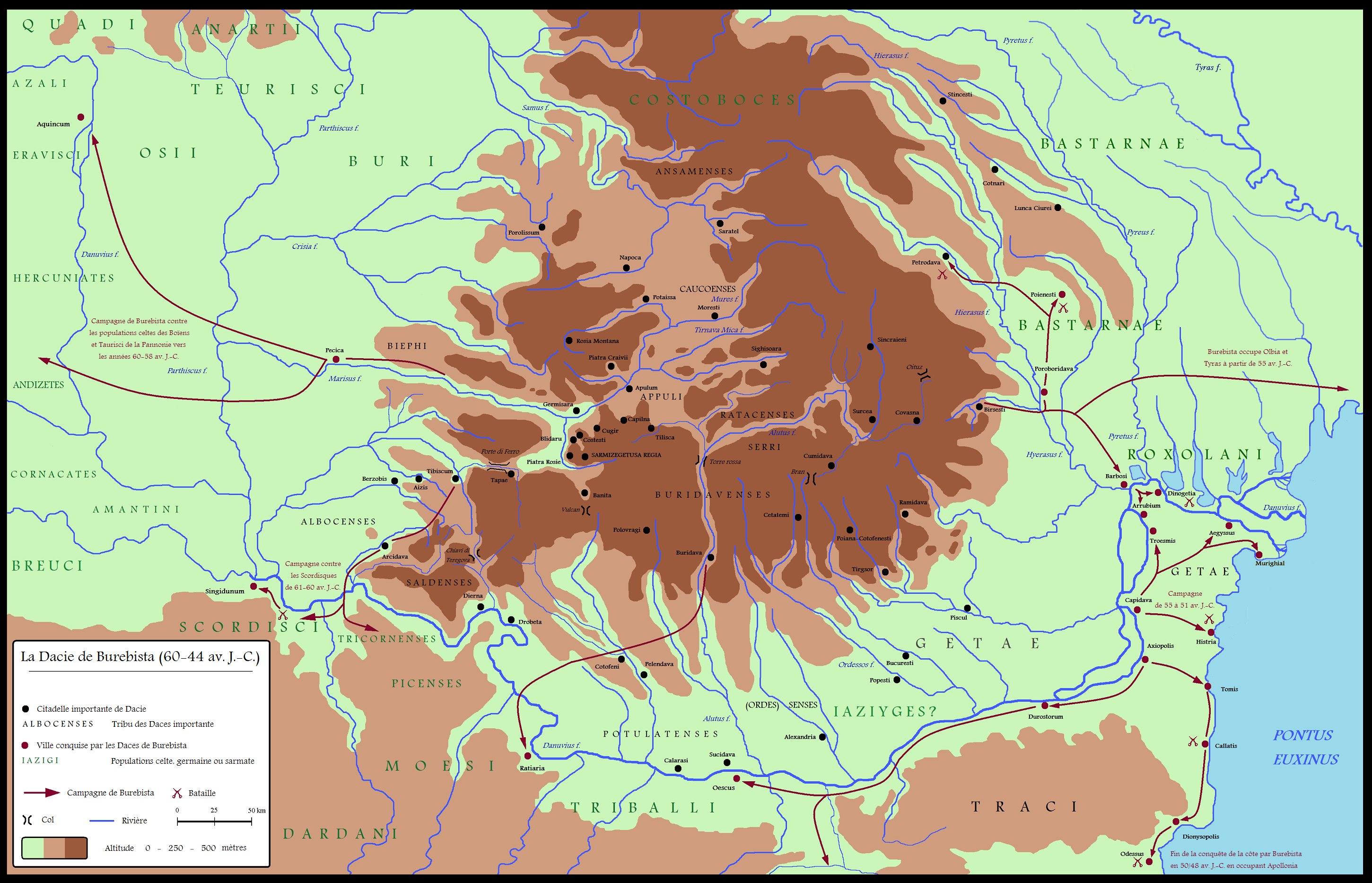
Dacian tribes.

Saldenses was a Dacian tribe.

== See also ==
- List of ancient cities in Thrace and Dacia
