= Maedi =

Thracian tribe in antiquity

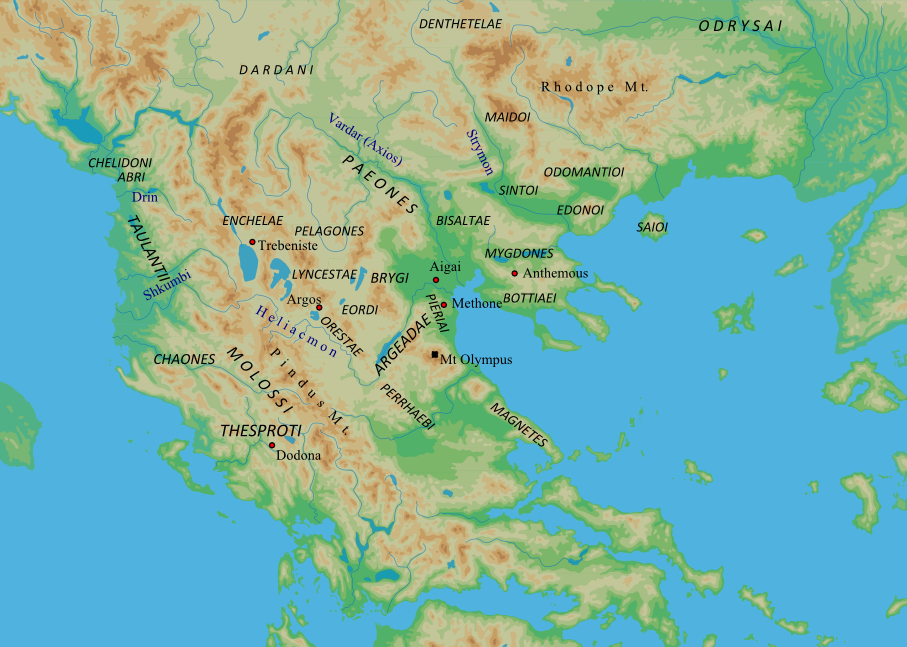
The Maedi are visible in this regional map (as "Maidoi").

The Maedi (also Maidans, Maedans, or Medi; Ancient Greek: Μαῖδοι or Μαιδοί) were a Thracian tribe in antiquity. They were an independent tribe through much of their history, and the Thracian king Sitalkes recognized their independence, along with several other warlike "border" tribes such as the Dardani, Agrianes, and Paeonians, whose lands formed a buffer zone between the powers of the Odrysians on the east and of Illyrian tribes in the west, while Macedon was located to the south of Paeonia.

The Maedi are said to have been of the same race as the Bithynians in Asia, and were hence called Maedobithyni. (Greek: Μαιδοβίθυνοι).

The ancient historian and biographer Plutarch describes Spartacus as "a Thracian of nomadic stock," in a possible reference to the Maedi. Plutarch also says that Spartacus' wife, a prophetess of the same tribe, was enslaved with him.

== Geography ==
Their land was called Maedica (Μαιδική). In historic times, they occupied the area between Paionia and Thrace, on the southwestern fringes of Thrace, along the middle course of the Strymon, between the Kresna Gorge and the Rupel Pass (present-day southwestern Bulgaria). Strabo says that the Maedi bordered eastward on the Thunatae of Dardania, and that the Axius flowed through their territory.

Their capital city was Iamphorynna, which lay somewhere in the southwest corner of what is now Bulgaria. Some archaeologists posit it in the area between the cities of Petrich and Sandanski, but its exact location remains unknown.

== Conflict with Macedon ==
According to Plutarch, the Maedi rebelled against their Macedonian overlords when King Philip II of Macedon was besieging Byzantium in 340 BC. The sixteen-year-old Alexander the Great, who had been left as regent by his father, led an army against the Maedi and founded his first city Alexandroplis.

In 89–84 BC (during the First Mithridatic War), the Maedi overran Macedon and sacked Delphi as allies of Mithridates. It is said that they made a habit of raiding Macedon when a king of Macedon was away on a campaign. Following this, Sulla ravaged the land of the Maedi.

== See also ==
- List of Thracian tribes
