= Biephi =

Ancient people of Dacia

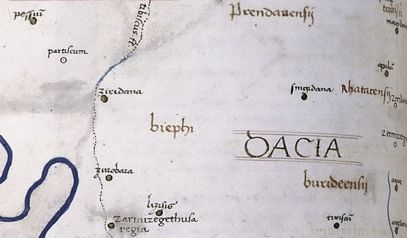
Biephi on Dacia's map from a medieval book made after Ptolemy's Geographia (ca. 140 AD).

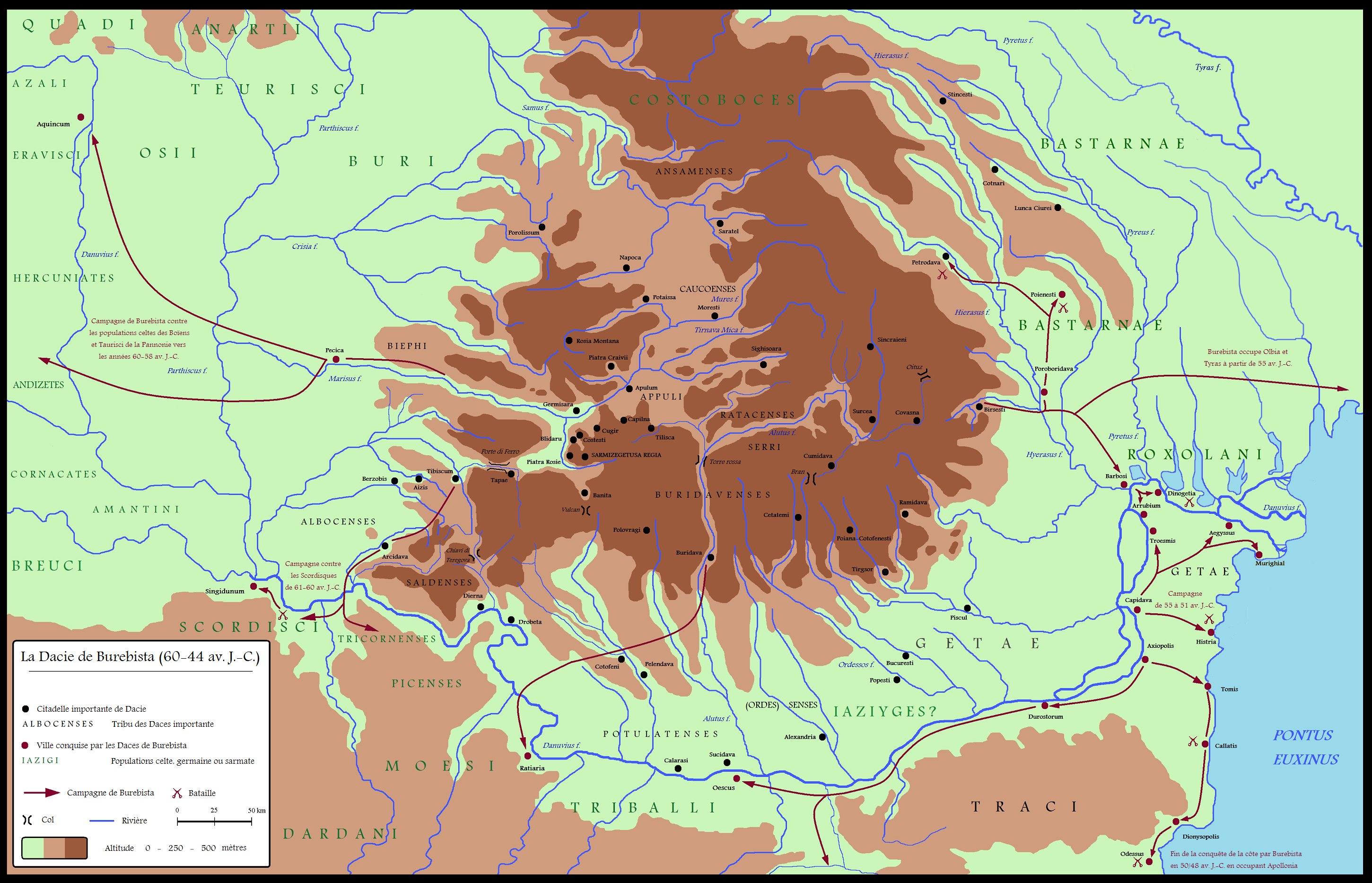
Dacian tribes.

Biephi was a Dacian tribe mentioned by Ptolemy in western part of Dacia. The name is probably corrupted from Biesi. Vasile Pârvan located this tribe outside Transylvania and Oltenia, its location in the northeast of Banat being closest to reality.

== See also ==
- List of ancient cities in Thrace and Dacia
