= Pieres =

Ancient Thracian tribe

Expulsion of the Pieres from the region of Olympus to the region of Pangaion by the Makedones

The Pieres (Ancient Greek,"Πίερες") were a Thracian tribe connected with the Brygi, that long before the archaic period in Greece occupied the narrow strip of plain land, or low hill, between the mouths of the Peneius and the Haliacmon rivers, at the foot of the great woody steeps of Mount Olympus. The region Pieria (Greek: Πιερία) in Lower Macedonia was named after them.

== Expulsion ==
The Pieres were expelled by the Makedones in the 8th century BC from their original seats, and driven to the North beyond the Strymon river and Mount Pangaeus, where they formed a new settlement which they named Pieris (Ancient Greek,"Πιερίς"). Herodotus mentions that they had mines in Mount Pangaeus and two fortresses. He writes the Pierians were among the nations that supplied the army of Xerxes. This district, which, under the name of Pieria or Pieris, is mentioned in the Homeric poems, was, according to legend, the birthplace of the Muses and of Orpheus, the father of song. When this worship was introduced into Boeotia, the names of the mountains, grottos, and springs with which this poetic religion was connected, were transferred from the North to the South.

The boundaries which historians and geographers give to this province vary. In the systematic geography of Ptolemy the name is given to the extent of coast between the mouths of the Ludias and the Haliacmon rivers. Pieria was bounded on the West from the contiguous district of the Thessalian Perrhaebia by the great chain of Olympus. An offshoot from Olympus advances along the Pierian plain, in a North-west direction, as far as the ravine of the Haliacmon, where the mountains are separated by that chasm in the great eastern ridge of Northern Greece from the portion of it anciently called Bermius. The highest summit of the Pierian range called Pierus Mons and is a conspicuous object in all the country to the East. It would seem that there was a city called Pieria, which may be represented by a tumulus, overgrown with trees upon the extremity of the ridge of Andreotissa, where it ends in a point between Dium and Pydna, the other two chief cities of Pieria. Beyond Pydna was a considerable forest, called Pieria Silva, which may have furnished the Pierian pitch, which had such a high reputation. The road from Pella to Larissa in Thessaly passed through Pieria, and was probably the route which the consul Quintus Marcius Philippus pursued in the third and fourth years of the third Macedonian War (171 BC–168 BC).

== See also ==
- Orpheus
- Pierian Spring
- Pieria (disambiguation)
