= Dii =

Dii is also the plural of Latin Deus.

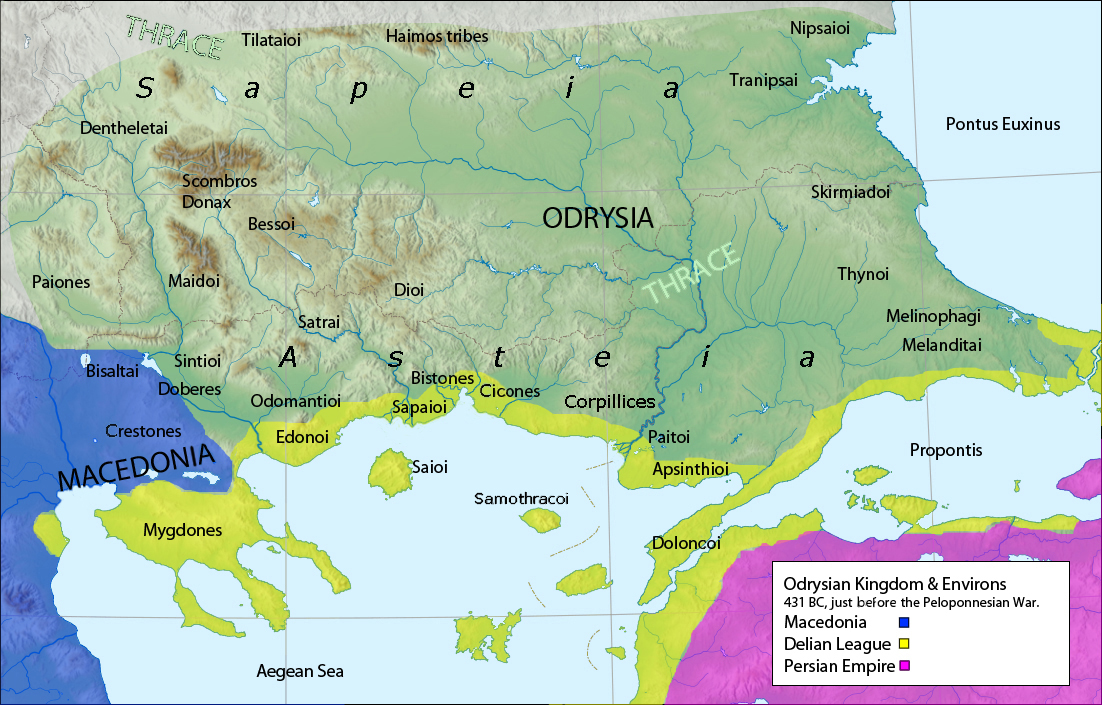
The approximate location of the Dii

The Dii (/ˈdaɪaɪ/; Ancient Greek: Δίοι, romanized: Díoi) were an independent Thracian tribe, swordsmen, who lived among the foothills of Mount Rhodope in Thrace, and particularly in the east bank of Nestos, from the springs to the Nestos gorge. They often joined the ranks of organized armies as mercenaries or volunteers. Thucydides declared that they were the most warlike infantry in Sitalkes' army.

Though usually described as swordsmen, they defeated a Theban cavalry by using peltast tactics, so they were certainly skilled in other areas of warfare as well. The Dii are known for their love of freedom and independence.

A Thracian uprising broke out on the territory of the Dii due to Thracian's opposition to sending military recruits for the Roman army. Prior to the uprising, the Dii fled to inaccessible rock formations in the Hemus and Rhodope mountains. The Dii sent envoys to the Roman envoys, promising to maintain friendship with the empire in exchange for the Romans to stop demanding recruits. The Romans refused and besieged the Dii. The leaders of the Dii rebellion –Tarsus, Turesis, and Dinus – killed themselves rather than surrender to the Romans.

== See also ==
- Bessi
