= Alba Iulia Fortress =

Historic fortress in Alba Iulia, Romania

Alba Carolina Citadel
- Cetatea Alba Carolina
- Alba Iulia in Romania
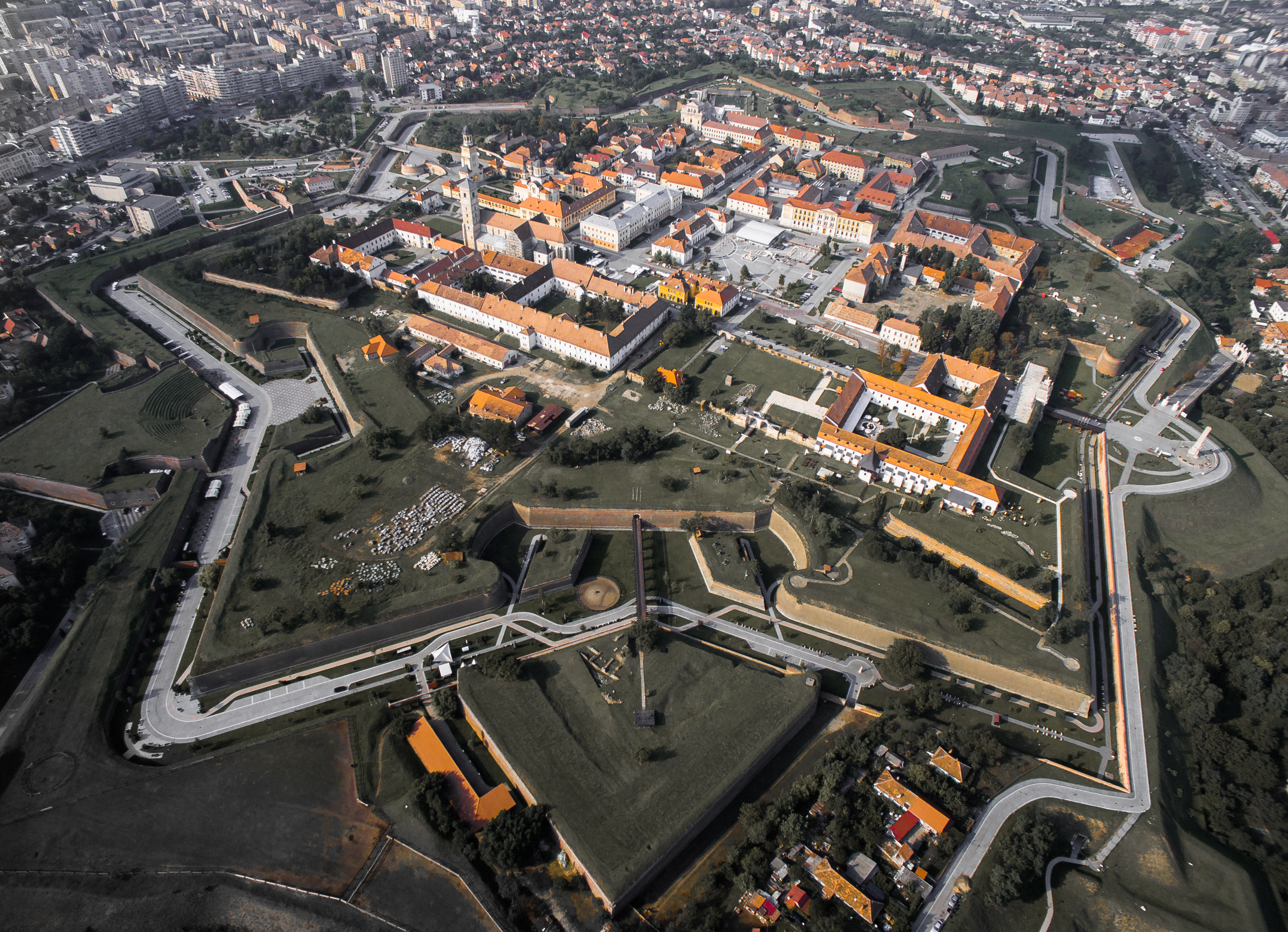
- Aerial shot of the fortress taken in 2007

Site information
- Type: Fortress
- Open to the public: Yes
- Condition: Restored

Location
- Location in Romania
- Coordinates: 46.06751°N 23.57124°E

Site history
- Built: 1715–1738
- Architect: Giovanno Morando Visconti

The Alba Carolina Citadel (Romanian: Cetatea Alba Carolina, Hungarian: Gyulafehérvári vár) is a star fortess located in the center of Alba Iulia, Romania. Its construction commenced on 4 November 1715, during the Habsburg rule in Transylvania, and was completed in 1738. 20,000 serfs were involved in its construction, which is estimated to have cost around 3 million florins. The citadel was built on the site of two other fortifications: the legionary fortress of Legio XIII Gemina (known as Apulum), as well as the medieval Belgrad citadel.

== Restoration ==
The shape of the citadel, an iconic element of Vauban architecture, influenced the design of Alba Iulia's city logo when the city adopted city branding in 2014. The city received 47.5 million lei in 2009 for the restoration and conservation of the citadel.

== Name ==
The citadel is named after Charles VI, known as Carol VI in Romanian, who was the Holy Roman Emperor at the time of the citadel's construction.

== See also ==
- Seven Wonders of Romania
