= Codex Burgundus =

15th century illuminated manuscript

The Codex Burgundus is a 15th-century Flemish illuminated manuscript book of hours, in the Batthyaneum Library in Alba Julia, Romania. It measures 180 x 120 mm (page), text 110 x 70 mm, binding 190 x 130 mm; and is written in one column with 16 lines per page. It has 55 miniatures on gold mosaic.

This is an anthology of prayers meant for the layman. It is written in Latin and French on quarto vellum and is bound in dark brown leather. The writing is uncial Gothic. The ornaments are geometrical and floral in blue, red, green, and gold. It has an iconographically unusual illustration depicting the Flight into Egypt with the Virgin Mary leading Joseph on a donkey.
