= Alba Iulia =

City and county capital in Alba County, Romania

- Municipality
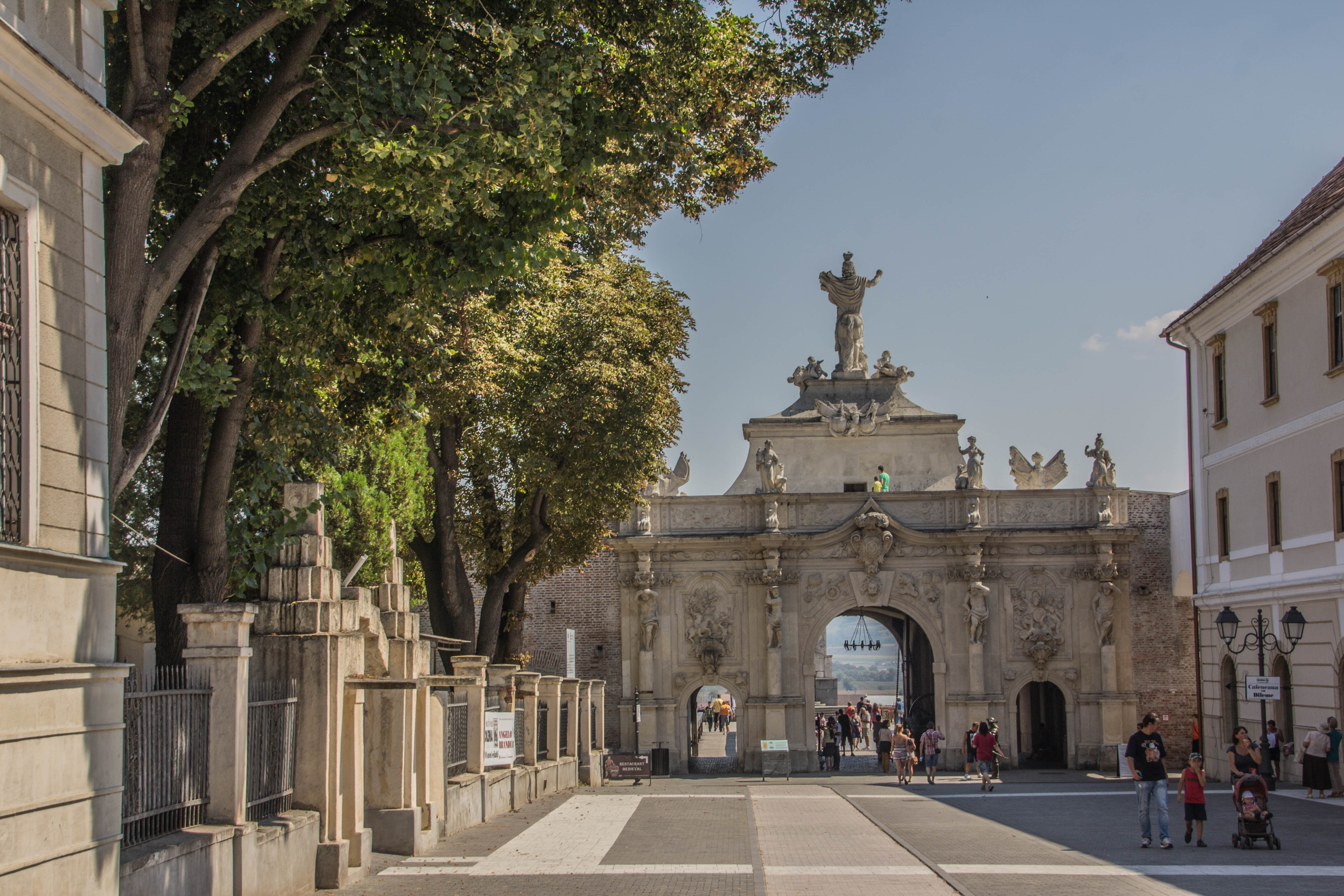
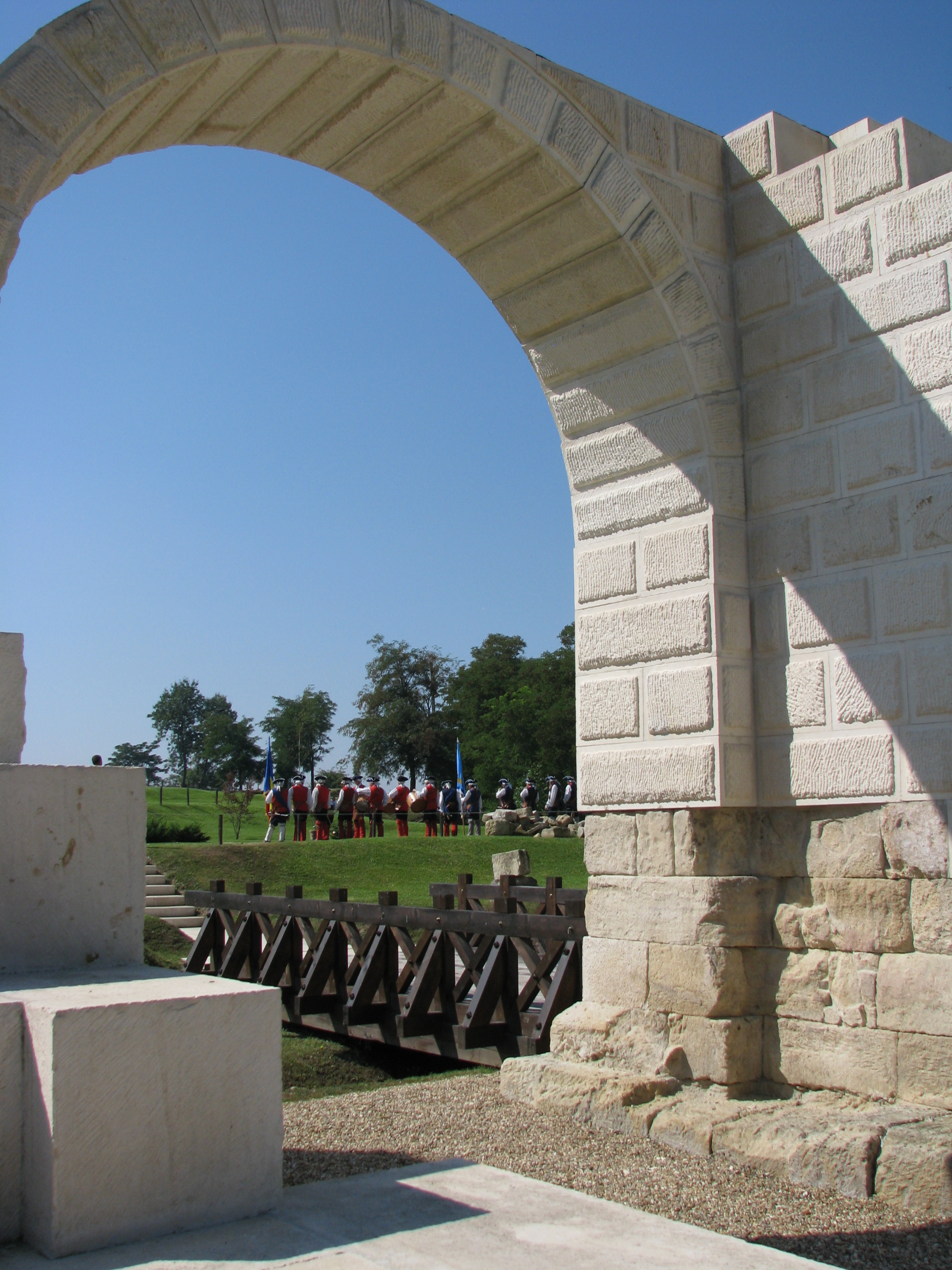
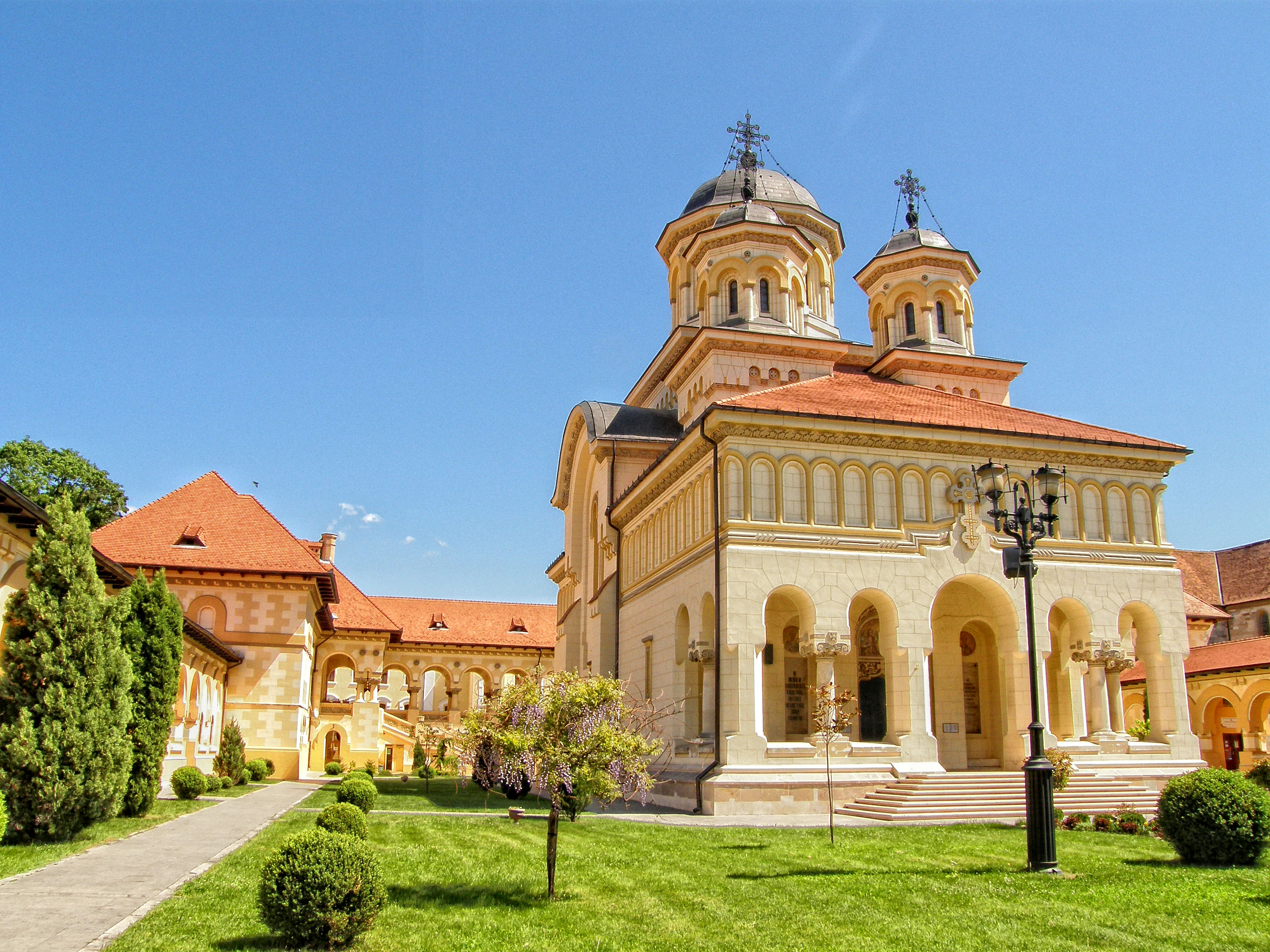
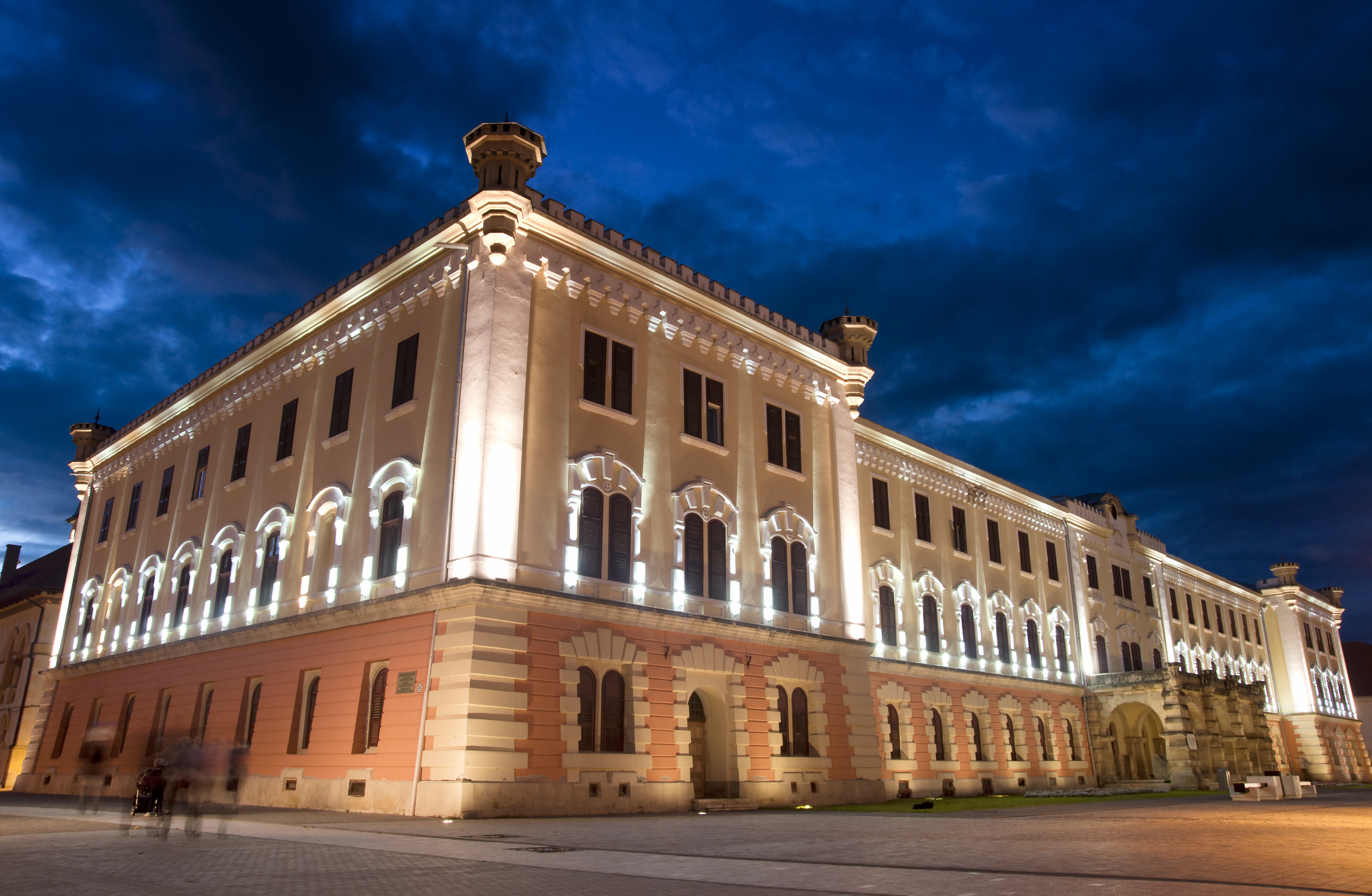
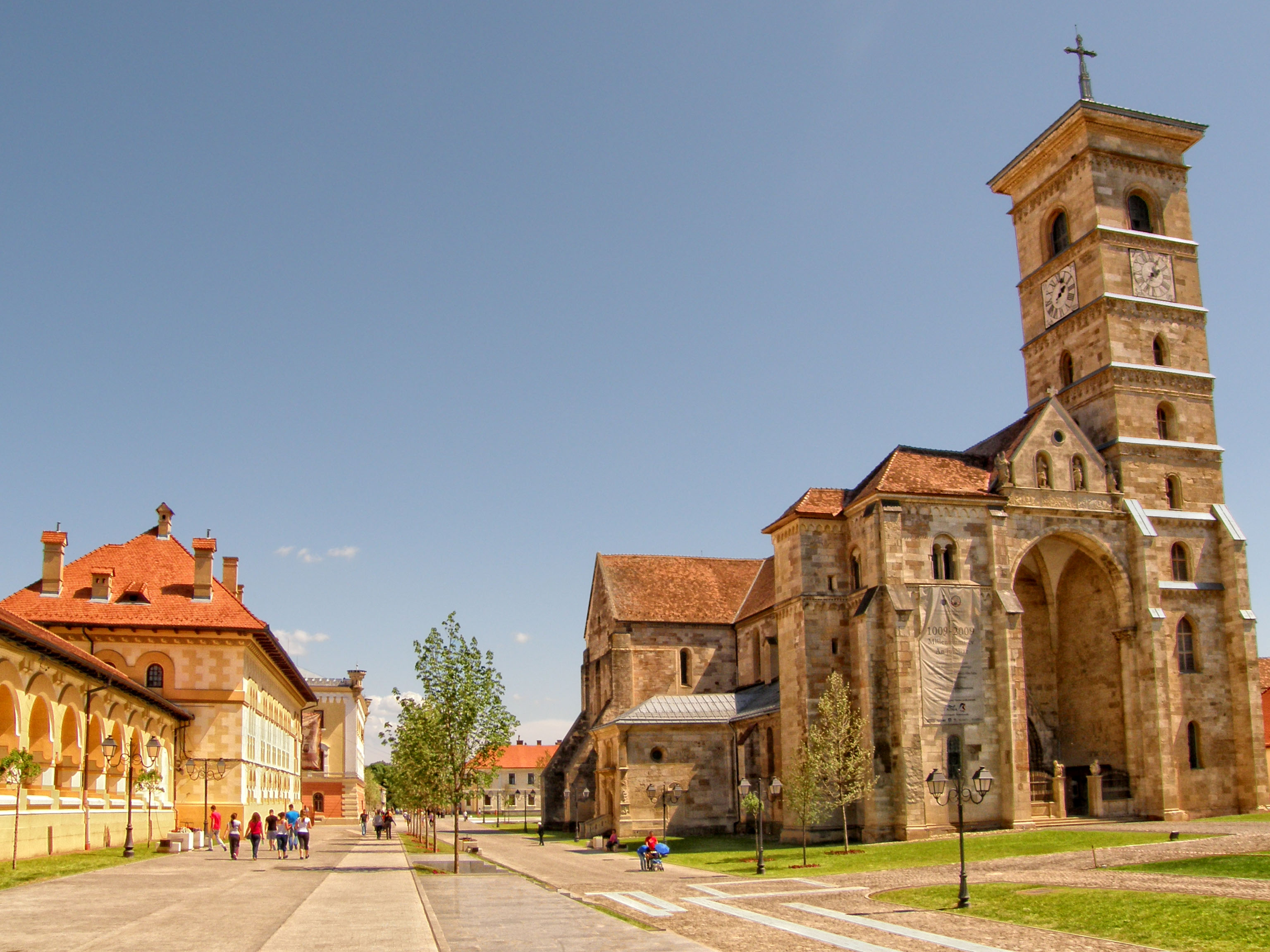
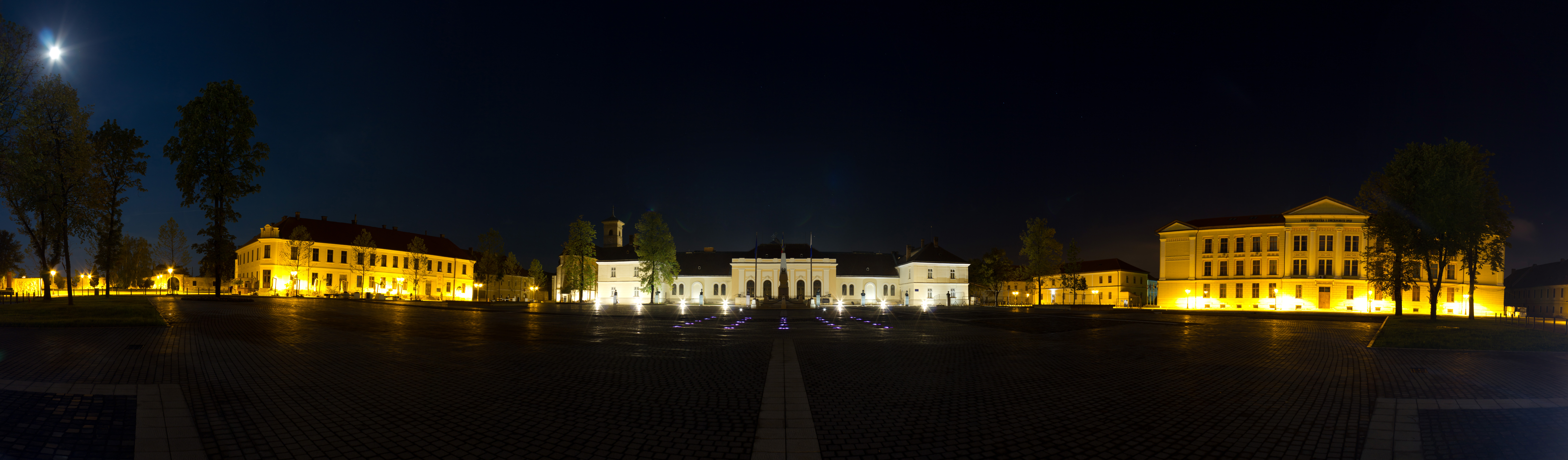
- Alba Carolina Citadel Porta Principalis Dextra Coronation Cathedral The Union Museum St. Michael Catholic Cathedral Custozza Park

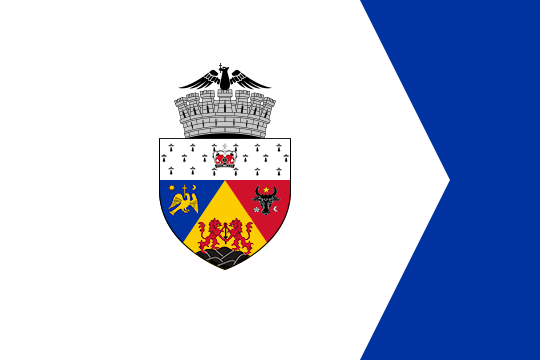
- Flag Coat of arms Brandmark

- Location in Alba County

- Location in Romania
- Coordinates: 46°4′1″N 23°34′12″E
- Country: Romania
- County: Alba

Government
  - Mayor: Gabriel Pleșa (2024–2028) (PNL)

Area
  - Total: 103.65 km^{2} (40.02 sq mi)

Population (2021-12-01)
  - Total: 64,227
  - Density: 619.65/km^{2} (1,604.9/sq mi)
- Time zone: UTC+2 (EET)
  - Summer (DST): UTC+3 (EEST)
- Website: www.apulum.ro

Alba Iulia (Romanian pronunciation: [ˌalba ˈjuli.a]; German: Karlsburg or Carlsburg, formerly Weißenburg [ˈvaɪsn̩bʊʁk]; Hungarian: Gyulafehérvár [ˈɟulɒfɛɦeːrvaːr]; Latin: Apulum) is a city that serves as the seat of Alba County in the west-central part of Romania. Located on the river Mureș in the historical region of Transylvania, it has a population of 64,227 (as of 2021).

During ancient times, the site was the location of the Roman camp Apulum. Since the High Middle Ages, the city has been the seat of Transylvania's Roman Catholic diocese. Between 1526 and 1570 it was the capital of the Eastern Hungarian Kingdom from which the Principality of Transylvania emerged by the Treaty of Speyer in 1570 and it was the capital of the Principality of Transylvania until 1711. At one point it also was a centre of the Eastern Orthodox Metropolitan of Transylvania with suffragan to Vad diocese. On 1 December 1918, the Union of Transylvania with Romania was declared in Alba Iulia, and Romania's King Ferdinand I and, in 1922 Queen Marie were crowned in the Alba Iulia Orthodox Cathedral.

Alba Iulia is historically important for Romanians, Hungarians, and Transylvanian Saxons. In December 1918, Alba Iulia was officially declared Capital of the Great Union of Romania.

The city administers four villages: Bărăbanț (Borbánd), Micești (Ompolykisfalud), Oarda (Alsóváradja), and Pâclișa (Poklos).

== Names ==
During the Roman period the settlement was called Apulum (from the Dacian Apoulon, mentioned by Ptolemy). When the settlement with its Roman ruins became the seat of a dukedom in the 10th century, the population may have been Slavic. From the 9th to the 11th centuries, the settlement bore the Slavic name Bălgrad (meaning "white castle" or "white town"). The old Romanian name of the town was Bălgrad, which originated from Slavic.

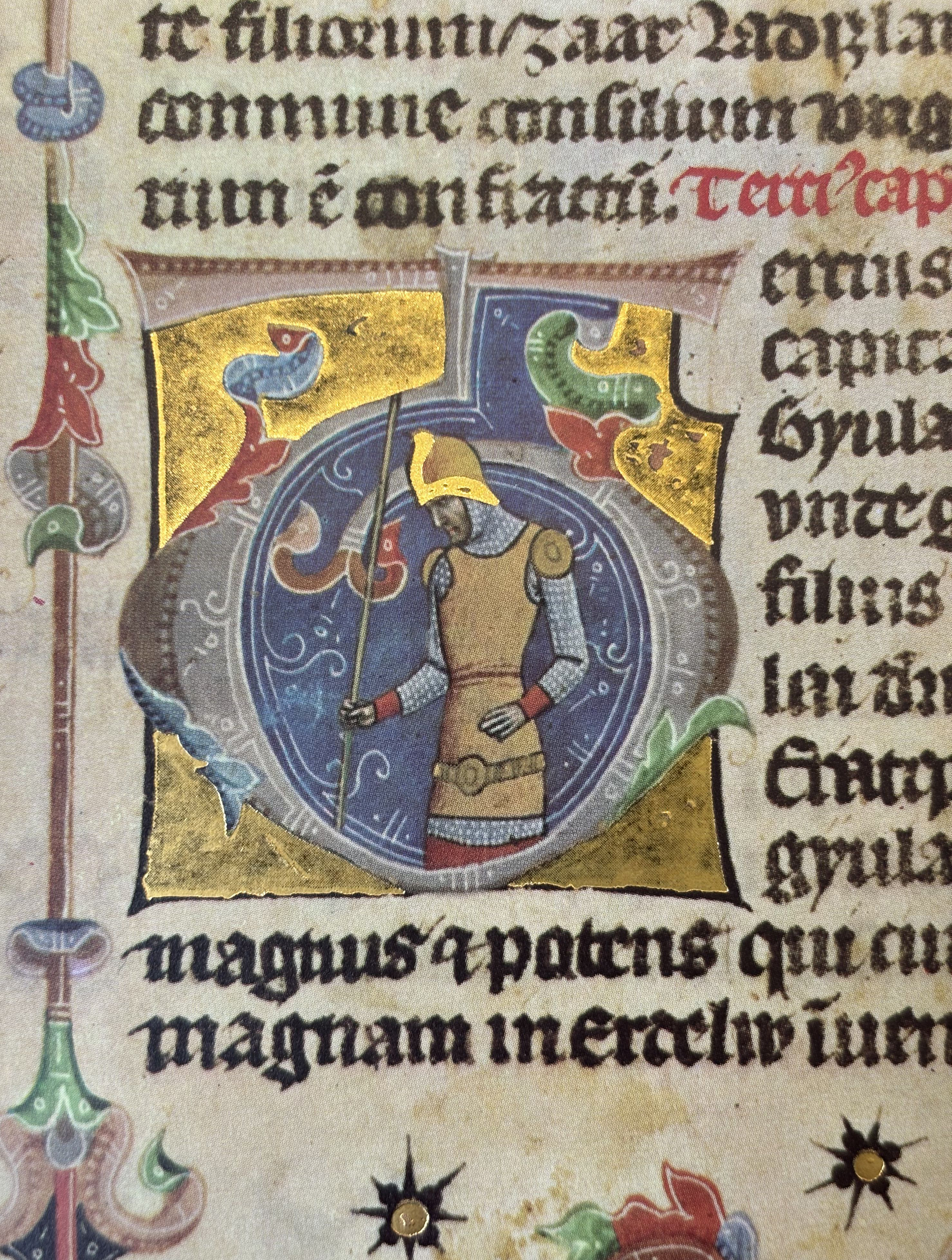
Gyula, one of the seven chieftains of the Hungarians (Illuminated Chronicle)

The earliest name attested are Castrum Albense and Alba Transilvana, in 1206, and Alba Jula in 1291. The Hungarian name Gyulafehérvár is a translation of the earlier Slavic form, meaning "white castle of the Gyula" meaning "white city of Julius". Alba is the Romanian feminine form of the word for white, and Iulia ("Julius") refers to Gyula II, a mid-10th-century Hungarian warlord who was baptized in Constantinople.

Under the influence of the Hungarian form, Gyulafehérvár, the town's Latin name eventually became Alba Julia or Alba Yulia. Its modern Romanian name, Alba Iulia, is the adoption of this that started to spread in Romanian in ordinary speech in the 18th century. The modern name has been officially used since the town became part of Romania.

The 16th-century German name was Weyssenburg. The Saxons later renamed the town to Karlsburg (Carlsburg) in honour of Charles VI (1685–1740). In Yiddish and Hebrew, Karlsburg was prevalent. In Ladino, Carlosburg was used. Alba Carolina was also a Neo-Latin form of its name.

Among Ruthenians, the city was known as Bilhorod ("white city").

The city's Latin name in the 10th century was Civitas Alba in Ereel. The first part of the name Alba denotes the ruins of the Roman fort Apulum, the pre-feudal white citadel. Later in the Middle Ages, different names were used: Frank episcopus Belleggradienesis in 1071, Albae Civitatis in 1134, Belegrada in 1153, Albensis Ultrasilvanus in 1177, eccl. Micahelis in 1199, Albe Transilvane in 1200, Albe Transsilvane in 1201, castrum Albens in 1206, canonicis Albensibus in 1213, Albensis eccl. Transsylvane in 1219, B. Michaelis arch. Transsilv. in 1231, Alba... Civitas in 1242, Alba sedes eptus in 1245, Alba Jula in 1291, Feyrvar in 1572, Feyérvár in 1574, Weissenburg in 1576, Belugrad in 1579, Gyula Feyervár in 1619, Gyula Fehérvár in 1690, and Karlsburg in 1715.

== History ==
=== Ancient times ===
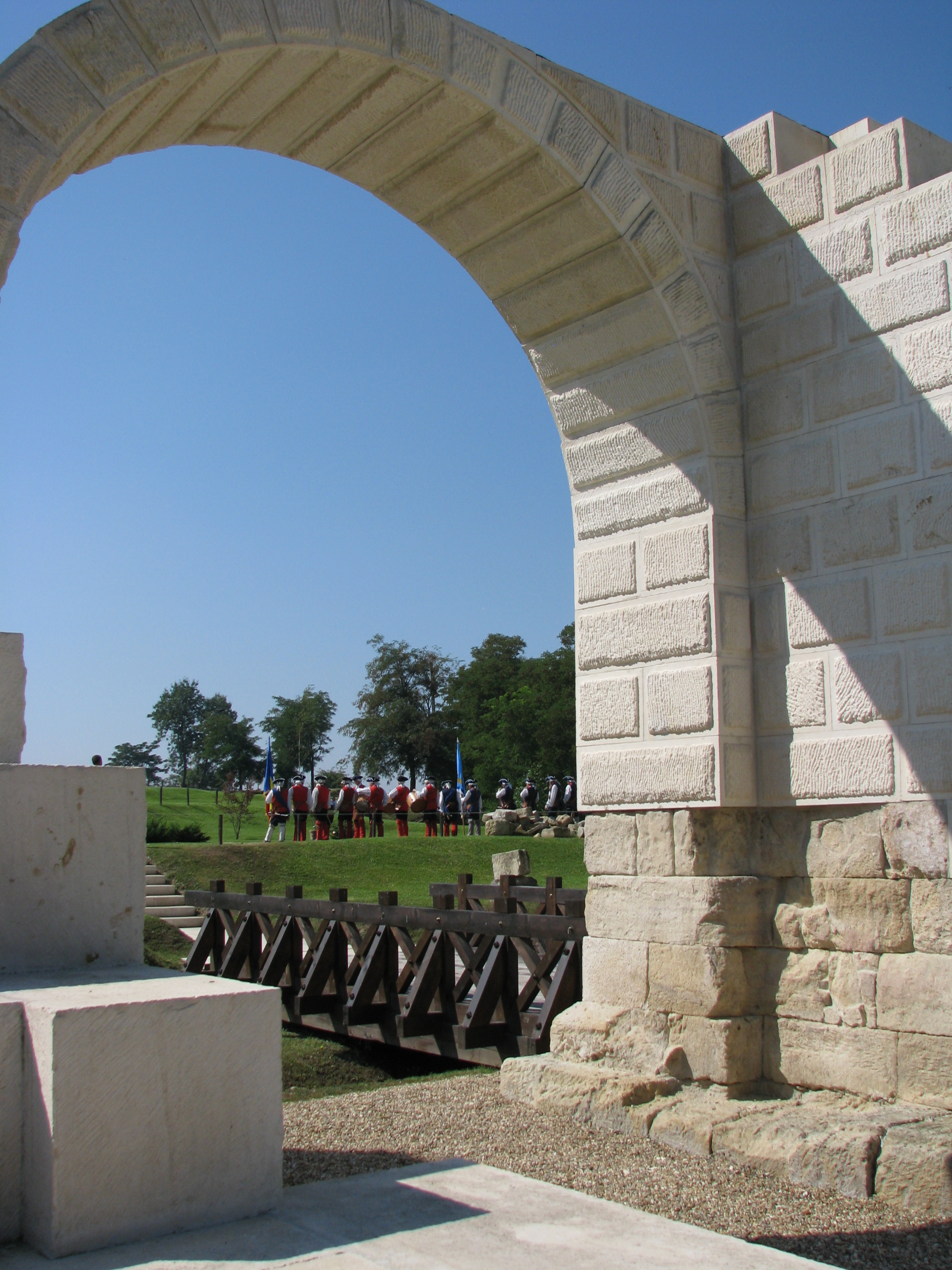
"Porta Principalis Dextra" of the castrum Apulum

The modern city is located near the site of the important Dacian political, economic and social centre of Apulon, which was mentioned by the ancient Greek geographer Ptolemy and believed by some archaeologists to be the Dacian fortifications on top of Piatra Craivii. After Dacia became a province of the Roman Empire, the capital of Dacia Apulensis was established here, and the city was known as Apulum. Apulum was the largest urban centre in Roman Dacia and was the seat of the XIII Gemina Legion. Apulum is the largest castrum located in Romania, occupying 37.5 hectares (93 acres) (750 × 500 m).

=== Middle Ages ===
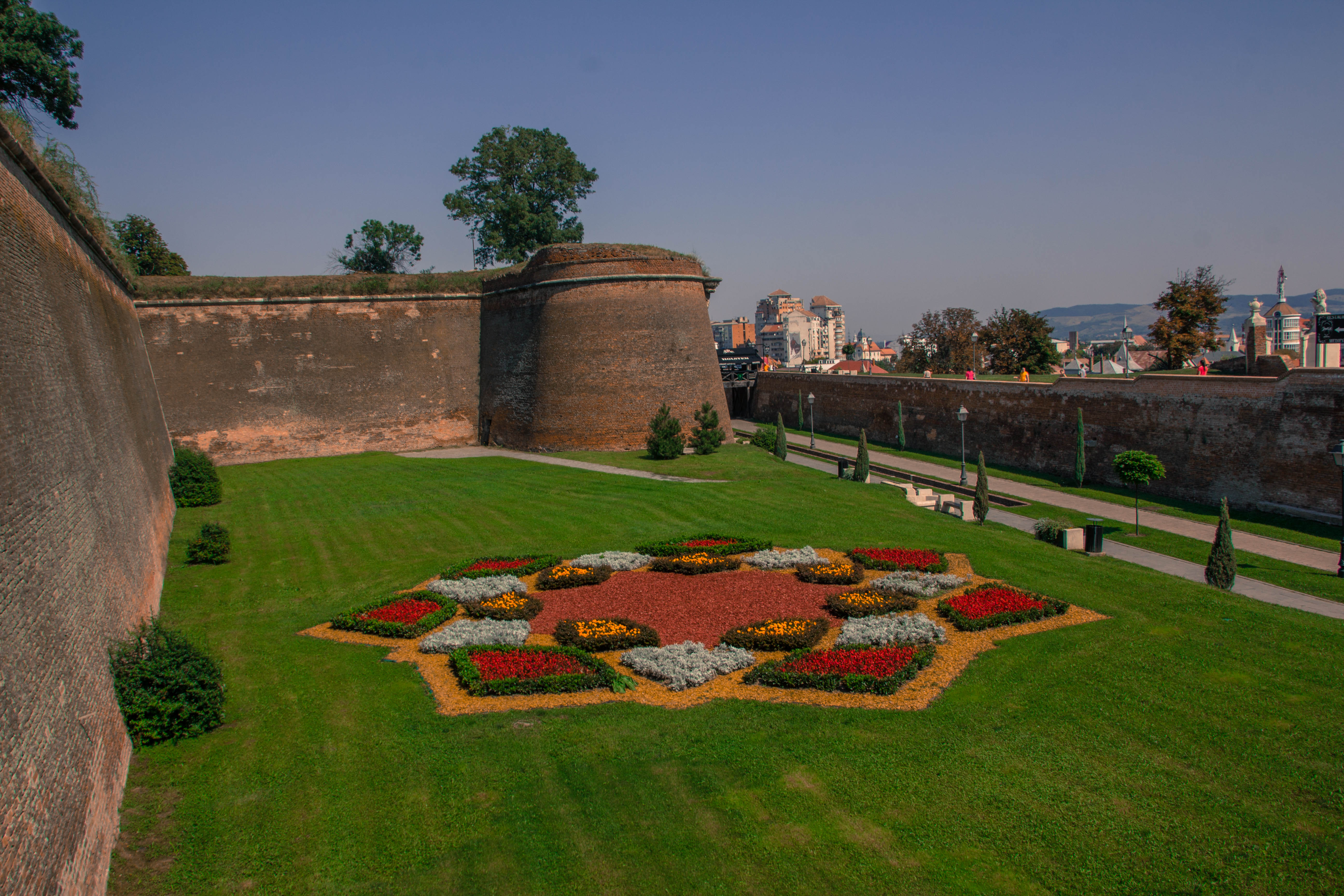
Defense wall of Alba Carolina citadel.

Analysis of the necropoles of the city prior to the 11th century show that they were used by a population different from the conquering Hungarians. Archaeological evidence shows Bulgarian presence in the 9th century.

The Gesta Hungarorum mentions a Hungarian regent named Jula or Geula—the maternal grandfather of Stephen I of Hungary and lord [regent] of Transylvania—who built the capital of his dukedom there during the 10th century. Geula was baptized in the Byzantine Empire and built around 950 in Alba Iulia the first church of Transylvania. The ruins of a church were discovered in 2011. According to Ioan Aurel Pop and other historians, here lived Hierotheos the first bishop of Transylvania, who accompanied Geula back to Hungary after Geula had been baptized in Constantinople around 950.

After Stephen I adopted Catholicism, and the establishment of the Catholic Transylvanian bishopric, recent archaeological discoveries suggest that the first cathedral was built in the 11th century or possibly before. The present Catholic cathedral was built in the 12th or 13th century. In 1442, John Hunyadi, Voivode of Transylvania, used the citadel to prepare for a major battle against the Ottoman Turks. The cathedral was enlarged during his reign and he was entombed there after his death.

=== Ottoman and Habsburg period ===
In 1542 — after the partition of the Kingdom of Hungary — Alba Iulia became the capital of Transylvania and some of its neighboring territories to the west (later known as Partium), the autonomous Principality of Transylvania, and remained so until 1690. The Treaty of Weissenburg was signed in the town in 1551. During the reign of Prince Gábor Bethlen, the city reached a high point in its cultural history with the establishment of an academy. The former Ottoman Turkish equivalent was Erdel Belgradı or Belgrad-ı Erdel ("Belgrade of Transylvania" in English) where Erdel ("Erdély" is a Hungarian name for Transilvania) was added to prevent confusion with Belgrade and Arnavut Belgradı ("Albanian Belgrade" in Turkish, early name of Berat during Ottoman rule).

On 29 November 1599, Michael the Brave, Voivode of Wallachia, entered Alba Iulia following his victory in the Battle of Șelimbăr and became Voivode of Transylvania. In 1600 he gained control of Moldavia, uniting the principalities of Wallachia, Moldavia and Transylvania under his rule, which lasted for a year and a half until he was murdered in 1601, by General Giorgio Basta's agents.

Alba Iulia became part of the Habsburg Monarchy in 1690. The fortress Alba Carolina, designed by architect Giovanni Morando Visconti, was built between 1716 and 1735, at the behest of Emperor Charles VI of Habsburg. The leaders of the Transylvanian peasant rebellion were executed in Alba Iulia in January 1785. Important milestones in the city's development include the creation of the Batthyaneum Library in 1780 and the arrival of the railway in the 19th century.

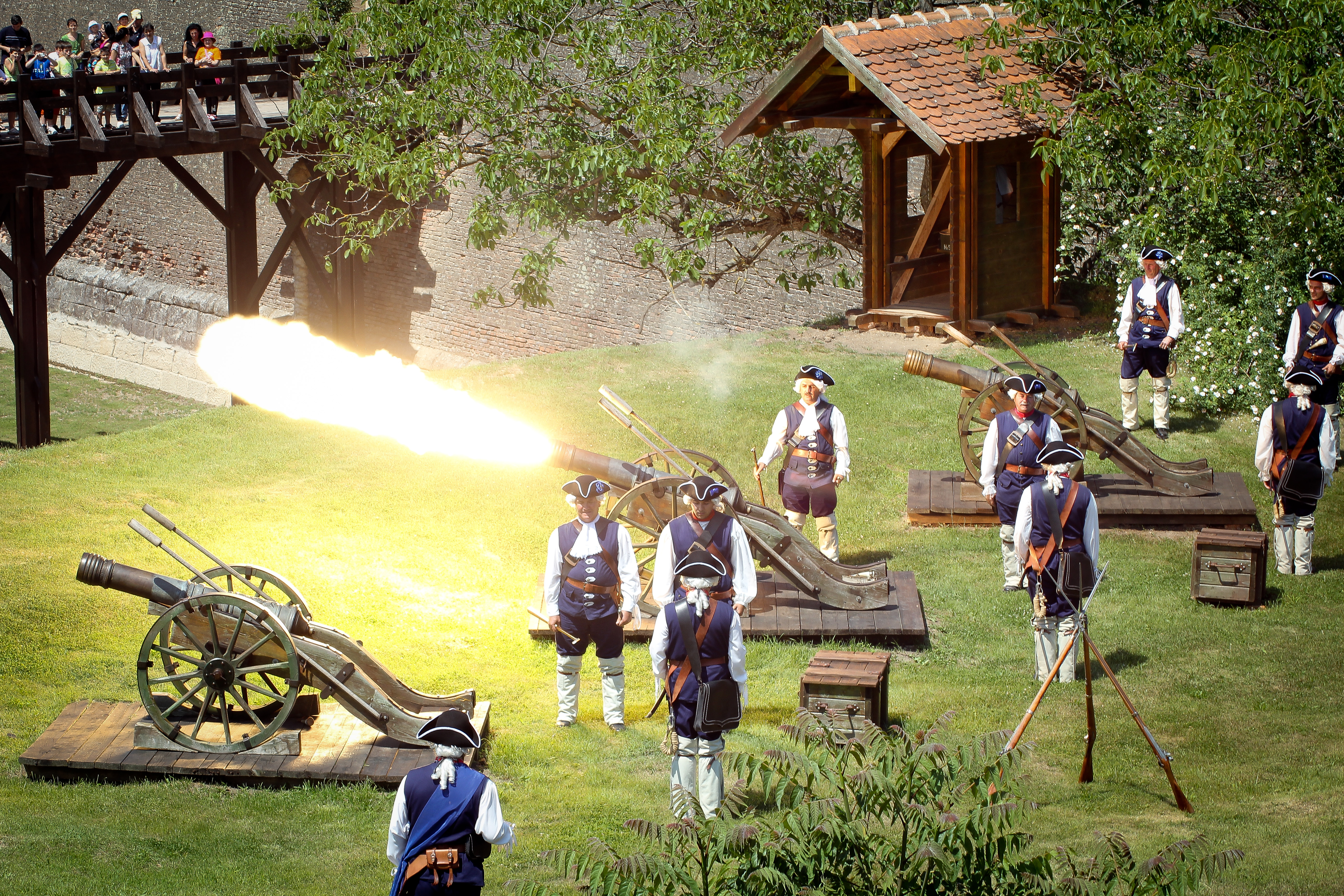
The Austrian Guard of the Citadel

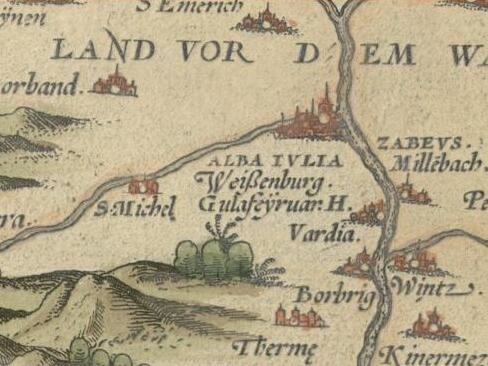
Alba Iulia on a 1556 map

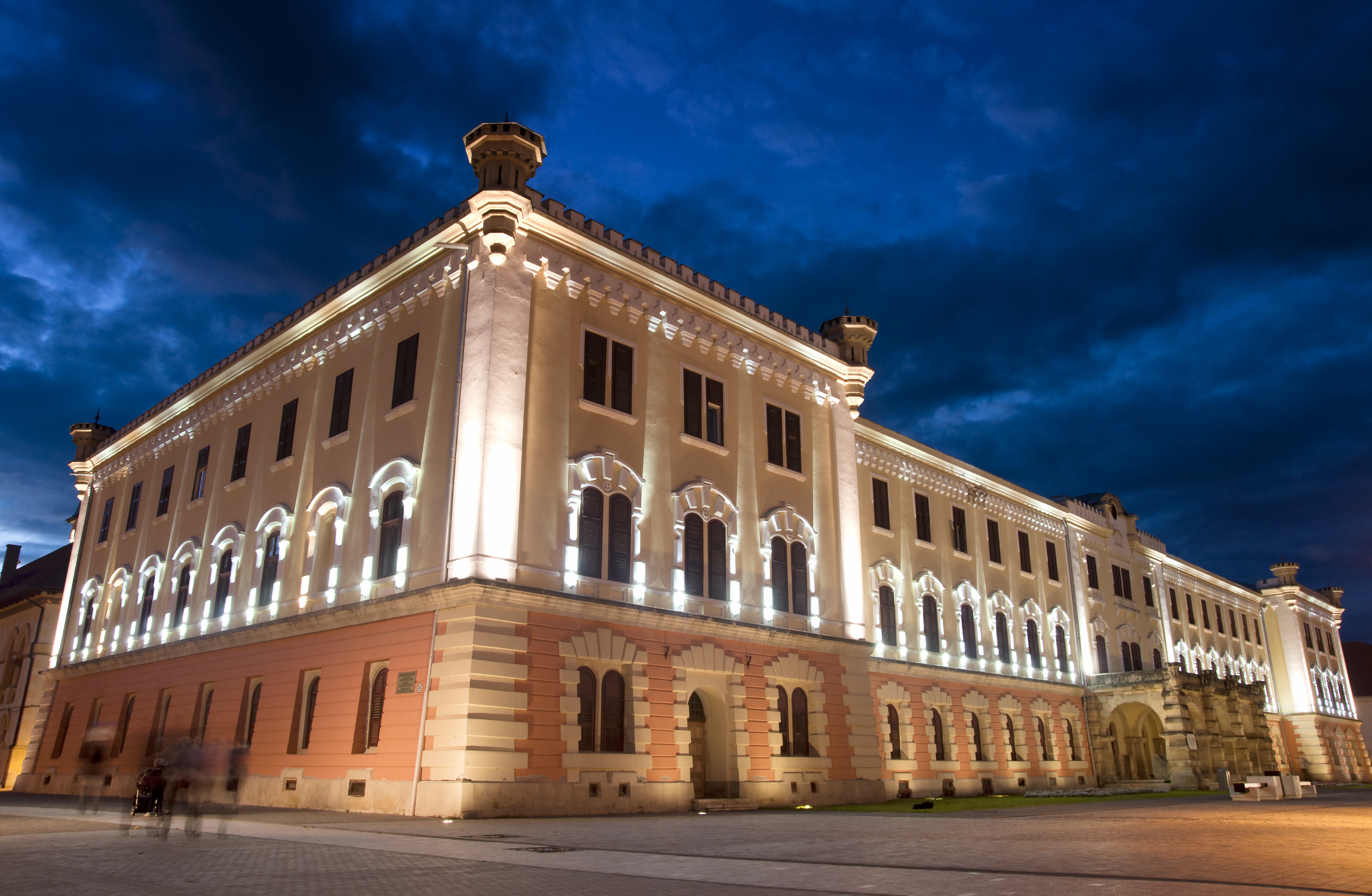
The Union Museum

=== 20th and 21st centuries ===
At the end of World War I, representatives of the Romanian population of Transylvania, the National Assembly of Romanians of Transylvania and Hungary, gathered in Alba Iulia on 1 December 1918 during the so-called Great National Assembly of Alba Iulia to proclaim the Union of Transylvania with the Kingdom of Romania. The representatives of the Transylvanian Saxons decided to join this declaration on 8 January 1919.

In 1922, Ferdinand I of Romania was symbolically crowned King of Romania in Alba Iulia. In October 2012, at the 90th anniversary of King Ferdinand's coronation, his great-granddaughter Princess Margarita of Romania visited Alba Iulia to commemorate the event.

=== Jewish history ===
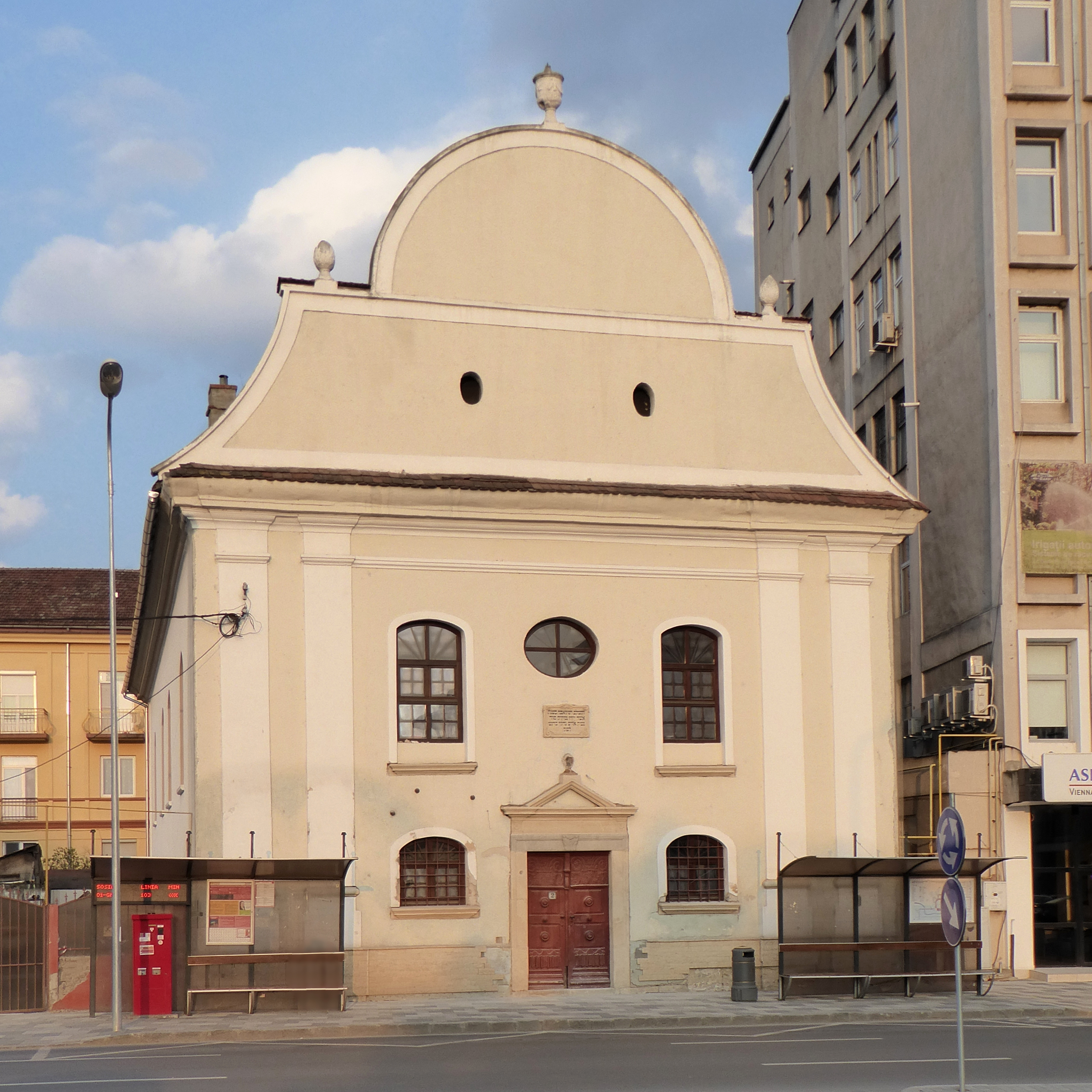
Alba Iulia synagogue

The Jewish community, which was the first in Transylvania, was established in the 14th century. A community was officially founded by permission of Prince Gabriel Bethlen in 1623. The 18th century saw an influx of Ashkenazim from Hungary and Wallachia, as well as Sephardim. From 1754 to 1868, the town rabbi was the chief rabbi of Transylvania. A synagogue was built in 1840, with a Sephardic one following in 1874. Most local Jews in the 19th century worked in viticulture and bought land for growing vines; in the 20th century, they were mainly artisans. By 1930, the 1558 Jews of Alba Iulia represented nearly 13% of the town's population.

In October 1940, during the National Legionary State, the Iron Guard terrorized local Jews. The following year, the Ion Antonescu regime confiscated Jewish property and sent the men to forced labour. After World War II, the community was re-established but soon dwindled as Jews emigrated.

== Climate ==
Alba Iulia has a humid continental climate (Dfa in the Köppen climate classification).

Climate data for Alba Iulia (coordinates:46°03′N 23°33′E, elevation: 246 masl.)
Month	Jan	Feb	Mar	Apr	May	Jun	Jul	Aug	Sep	Oct	Nov	Dec	Year
Record high °C (°F)	17.9 (64.2)	20.5 (68.9)	27.8 (82.0)	31.5 (88.7)	38.0 (100.4)	38.2 (100.8)	40.6 (105.1)	42.5 (108.5)	37.2 (99.0)	29.1 (84.4)	23.7 (74.7)	19.1 (66.4)	42.5 (108.5)
Mean daily maximum °C (°F)	3.5 (38.3)	8.2 (46.8)	13.6 (56.5)	18.6 (65.5)	22.5 (72.5)	27.9 (82.2)	29.7 (85.5)	30.3 (86.5)	25.0 (77.0)	18.0 (64.4)	10.3 (50.5)	5.1 (41.2)	17.6 (63.7)
Daily mean °C (°F)	0.1 (32.2)	3.7 (38.7)	7.7 (45.9)	12.1 (53.8)	16.5 (61.7)	21.4 (70.5)	22.9 (73.2)	23.1 (73.6)	18.5 (65.3)	12.1 (53.8)	6.4 (43.5)	2.4 (36.3)	12.1 (53.8)
Mean daily minimum °C (°F)	−3.3 (26.1)	−0.8 (30.6)	1.8 (35.2)	5.6 (42.1)	10.4 (50.7)	15.0 (59.0)	16.1 (61.0)	15.9 (60.6)	11.9 (53.4)	6.2 (43.2)	2.6 (36.7)	−0.3 (31.5)	6.7 (44.1)
Record low °C (°F)	−31.0 (−23.8)	−23.4 (−10.1)	−18.0 (−0.4)	−5.5 (22.1)	1.4 (34.5)	7.1 (44.8)	8.7 (47.7)	6.7 (44.1)	−0.6 (30.9)	−3.1 (26.4)	−9.2 (15.4)	−16.0 (3.2)	−31.0 (−23.8)
Average precipitation mm (inches)	25.4 (1.00)	25.0 (0.98)	32.7 (1.29)	37.5 (1.48)	79.0 (3.11)	106.1 (4.18)	70.7 (2.78)	49.9 (1.96)	42.5 (1.67)	34.7 (1.37)	39.3 (1.55)	30.1 (1.19)	572.9 (22.56)
Average precipitation days (≥ 0.1 mm)	12.7	11.4	11	10.4	15.8	13.6	11.3	8.4	9.2	9.2	12.9	11.9	137.8
Average snowy days	6.2	2.3	2.1	0.6	0	0	0	0	0	0	1.2	3.2	15.6
Source: Meteomanz (2014-2026); Infoclimat (1981-2020); Hotnews

== Landmarks ==
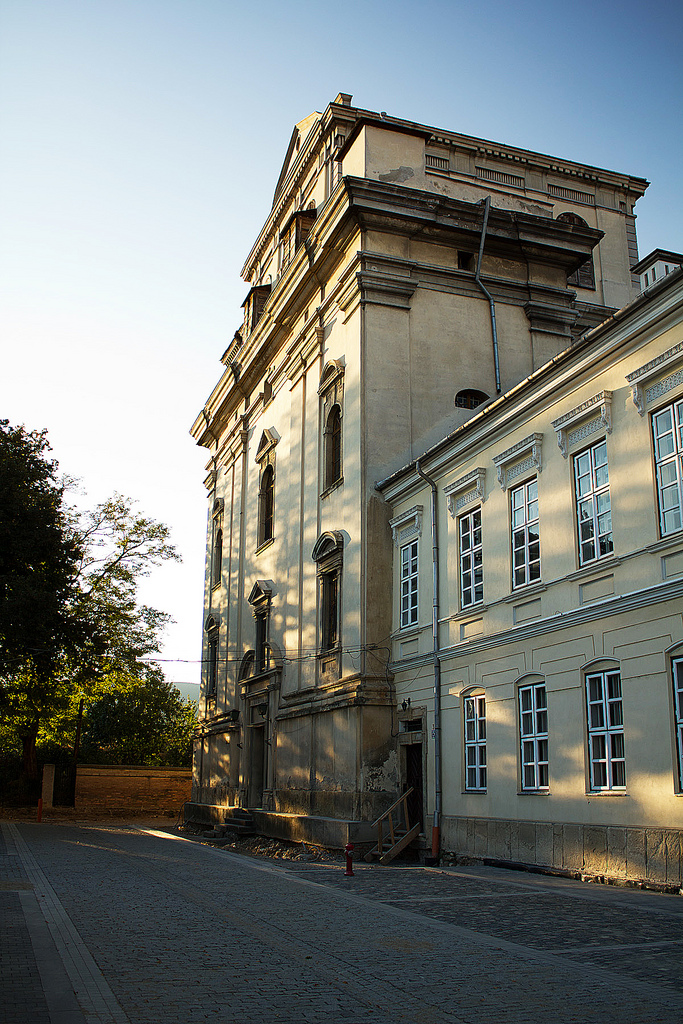
The Batthyaneum Library, former monastery of the Trinitarians

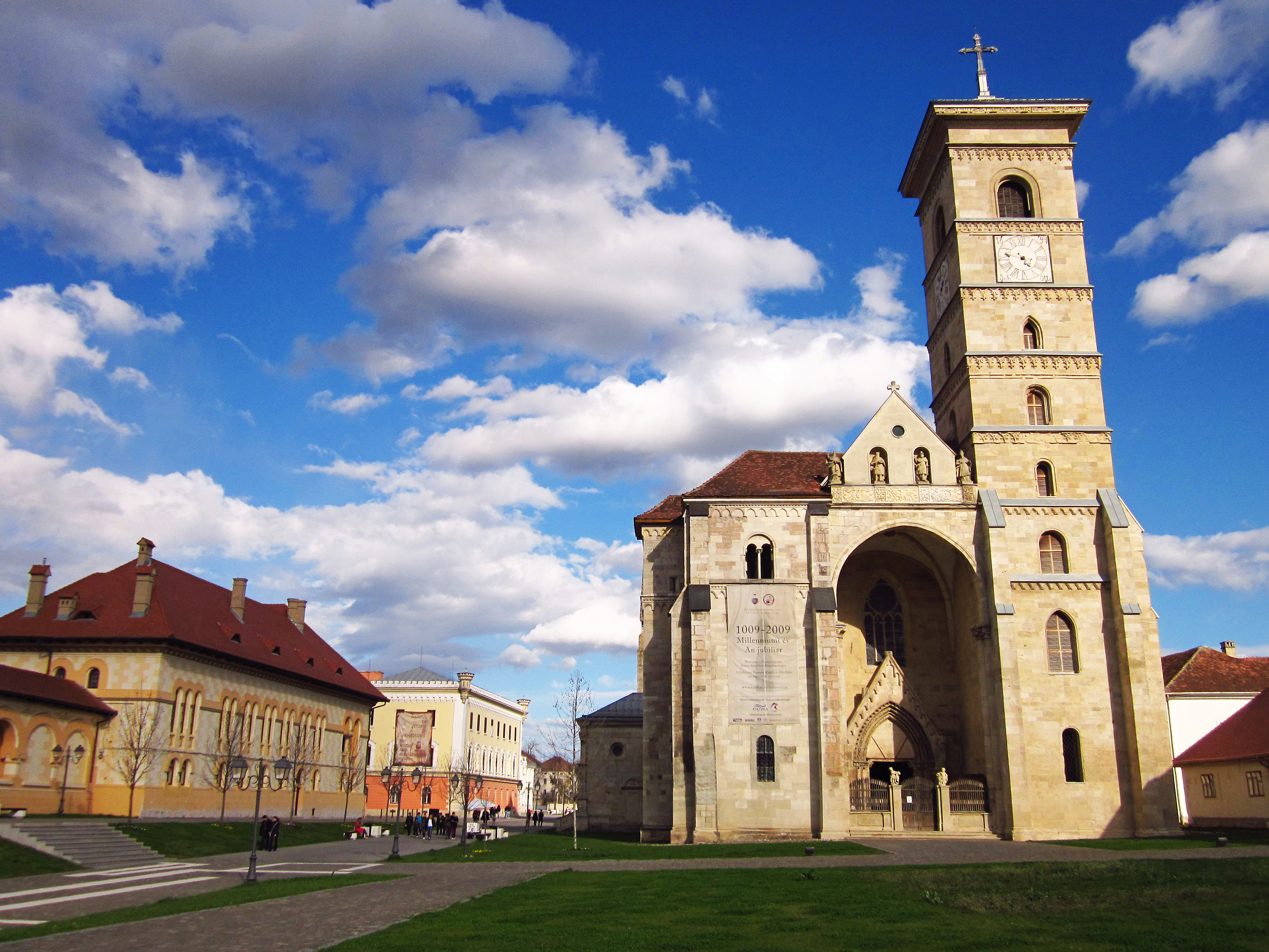
The Roman Catholic Cathedral. Its tower dates from the 17th century.

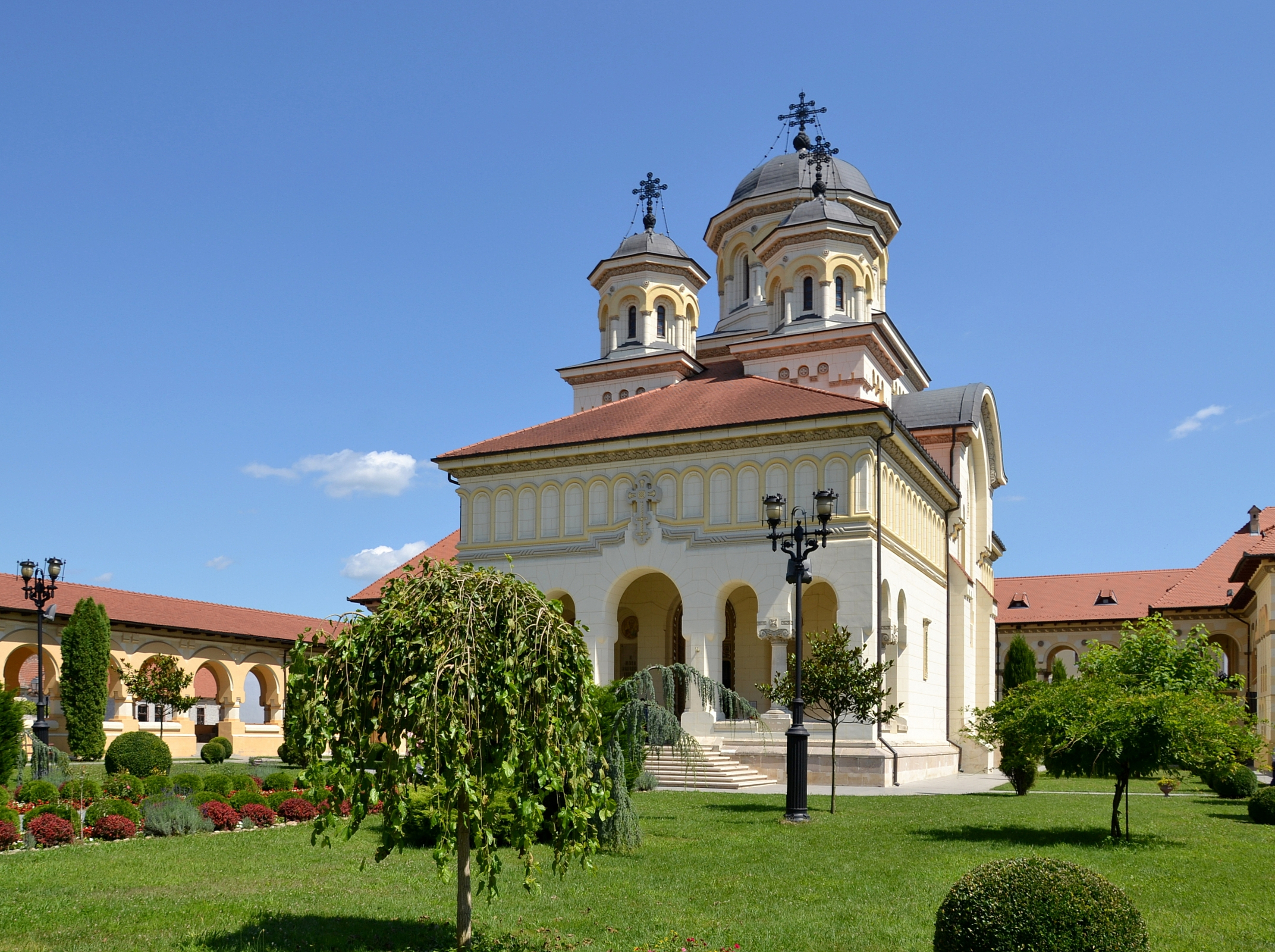
Romanian Orthodox Cathedral, early 20th century

The main historical area of Alba Iulia is the Upper Town region, developed by Charles VI, Holy Roman Emperor, in honour of whom the Habsburgs renamed the city Karlsburg. The fortress, with seven bastions in a stellar shape, was constructed between 1716 and 1735 by two Swiss fortification architects. The first was Giovanni Morandi Visconti, who built two old Italian-style bastions. The second was Nicolas Doxat de Demoret—nicknamed "Austrian Vauban". After 1720, the two architects radically transformed the medieval fortress shaped by the former Roman castrum into a seven-bastion baroque fortress, developing Menno van Coehorn's new Dutch system, of which the fortress of Alba Iulia is the best preserved example.

Inside the fortress are The Union Hall with the National Honour Gallery, The National History Museum of Unification, the Princely Palace (Voivodal Palace), the Orthodox cathedral, the Roman Catholic cathedral, the Batthyaneum Library, the Roman Catholic bishop's palace, the Apor Palace, and the University of Alba Iulia. Built in the 10th and 11th centuries, the Roman Catholic cathedral is the most representative building in the medieval Romanic style in Transylvania, and is considered to be an important monument of early Transylvanian medieval architecture. The tombs of John Hunyadi and Isabella Jagiełło—Queen of Hungary are located there.

The Batthyaneum Library is held in a former church built in Baroque style. In 1780, Ignác Batthyány, bishop of Transylvania, adapted the inside of the building for use as a library. It is famous for its series of manuscripts, incunabula and rare books—such as half of the 9th century Codex Aureus of Lorsch, the 15th century Codex Burgundus and the 13th century Biblia Sacra (13th century). The first astronomical observatory in Transylvania was founded here in 1792. The Apor Palace, situated on the same street as the Bathyaneum Library, belonged to Prince Apor and was built in the second half of the 17th century. At the beginning of the 18th century, it was the residence of the Austrian army leader Prince Steinville. The palace was renovated in 2007 under the supervision of the Romanian Ministry of Culture.

The Orthodox Unification Cathedral was built between 1921 and 1923, following the plans of architect D.G. Ștefănescu and built under the supervision of eng. T. Eremia. The frescoes were painted by Constantin in a traditional iconographic style. The first monarchs of the Unified Romania, King Ferdinand I and Queen Marie were crowned in the cathedral on 15 October 1922.

The National Museum of Unification in Alba Iulia is located in the "Babylon" Building. It was built between 1851 and 1853 for military purposes and became a museum in 1887. The museum exhibits over 130,000 pieces of artworks, organized chronologically. The Unification Hall, also part of the National History Museum, retains historical significance from having hosted, on 1 December 1918, the rally of the 1228 Romanian delegations from Transylvania who determined the province's union with the Kingdom of Romania. The building was used in 1895 as a military casino.

The Princely Palace (Palatul Principilor or Palatul Voievodal) was Michael the Brave's residence during the first political unification of the Romanians in 1600. Foreign chronicles pictured it as an extremely luxurious building, richly adorned with frescos and marble stairs, which later deteriorated. During the rule of Princes Gábor Bethlen and George II Rákóczi the second palace was restored, but not to its previous condition. After 1716, the building was used as an Habsburg Imperial Army barracks.

== Natives ==
- Francis I Rákóczi (1645–1676), elected prince of Transylvania
- Michael II Apafi (1676–1713), Prince of Transylvania 1690 to 1699
- Ernst Michael Mangel (1800–1887), musician and Philhellene
- Rudolf Züllich (1813–1890), sculptor
- Alexandru Borza (1887–1971), botanist and monk
- Ernest Krausz (1931–2018), Israeli professor of sociology and President at Bar Ilan University
- Dan Eugen Demco (1942–), physicist and member of the Romanian Academy
- Ion Mărgineanu (1949–), writer and poet
- Marius Moga (1981–), producer, composer, and singer

== Other notable residents ==
- Johann Heinrich Alsted (1588–1638), German Calvinist minister and academic. Spent his last years and died there.
- David Friesenhausen (1756–1828), Jewish writer, mathematician, and rabbi. Retired and died there.

== Twin towns – sister cities ==
Alba Iulia is twinned with:

- Aigio, Greece
- Alcalá de Henares, Spain
- Alessandria, Italy
- Arnsberg, Germany
- Biograd na Moru, Croatia
- Cetinje, Montenegro
- Chișinău, Moldova
- Düzce, Turkey
- Lanzhou, China
- Nof HaGalil, Israel
- Sliven, Bulgaria
- Székesfehérvár, Hungary
- Varese, Italy
- Viadana, Italy

== Demographics ==
Historical population
Year	Pop.	±%
1850	5,408	—
1880	7,338	+35.7%
1890	8,167	+11.3%
1900	11,507	+40.9%
1912	11,616	+0.9%
1930	12,282	+5.7%
1948	14,420	+17.4%
1956	14,776	+2.5%
1966	22,215	+50.3%
1977	41,199	+85.5%
1992	71,168	+72.7%
2002	66,369	−6.7%
2011	63,536	−4.3%
2021	64,227	+1.1%
Source: Census data

According to the 2021 census, there was a total population of 64,227 people living in this city. At the 2011 census, there were 63,536 inhabitants; of these, 95.3% were ethnic Romanians, 3.2% Romani, 1.9% Hungarians, and 0.2% Germans (more specifically Transylvanian Saxons).

In 1850, Alba Iulia had 5,408 inhabitants, 2,530 of them being Romanians (46.78%), 1,009 Hungarians (18.67%), 748 Germans/Transylvanian Saxons (13.83%), and 1,121 (20.73%) others.

In 1891, the city had 8,167 residents, of which 3,482 were Hungarians (42.63%), 3,426 Romanians (41.94%), and 867 Germans/Transylvanian Saxons (10.62%). By 1910 the number of inhabitants increased to 11,616. 5,226 of them were Hungarians (45%), 5,170 Romanians (44.51%), and 792 Germans/Transylvanian Saxons (6.82%). At the 1930 census, 34.7% of the population were Romanian Orthodox, 28.1% Romanian Greek Catholic, 12.9% Roman Catholic, 12.7% Jews, 7.3% Reformed Protestant, and 3.1% Lutheran.

== Panoramas ==
Panoramic view of Alba Iulia, Transylvania, Romania
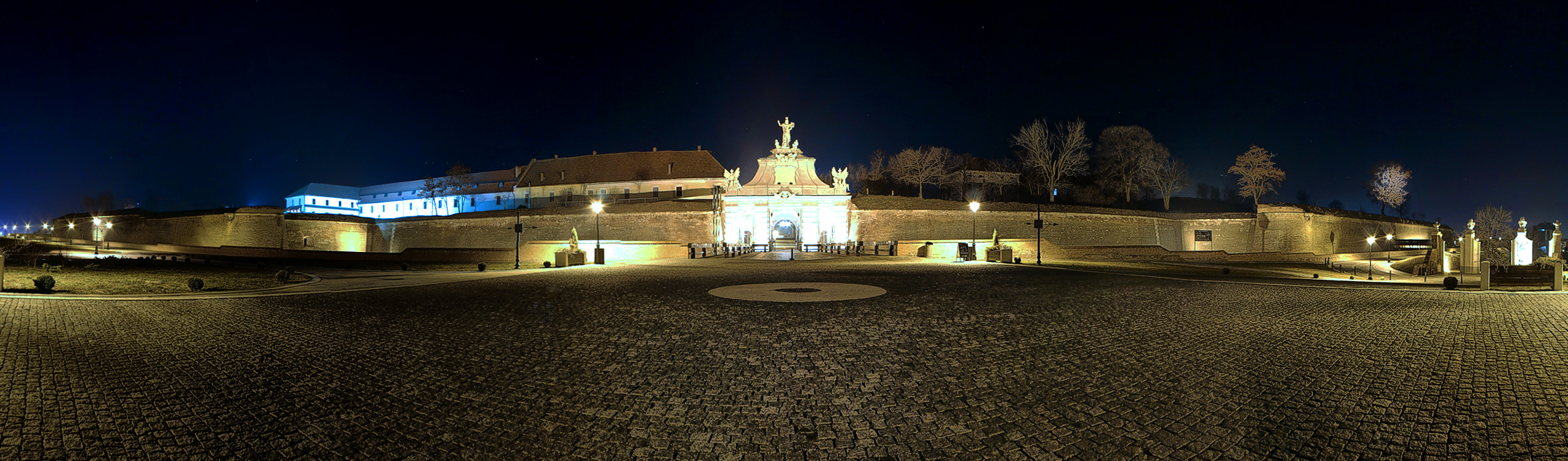
Panoramic view of Alba Iulia, Transylvania, Romania
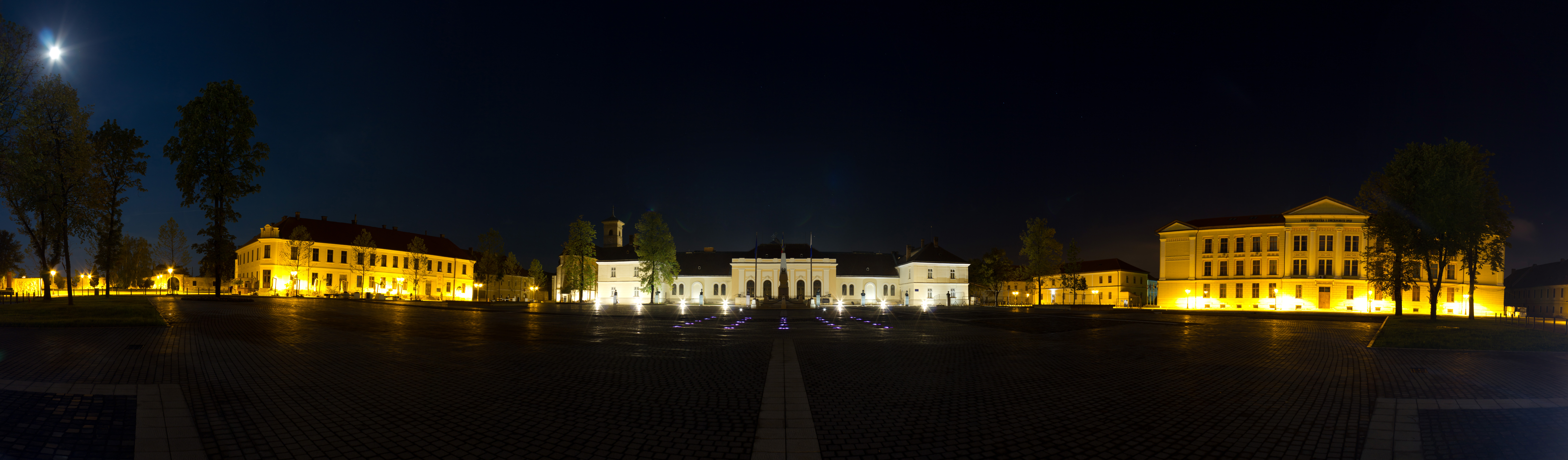
Panoramic view of Alba Iulia, Transylvania, Romania

== Image gallery ==
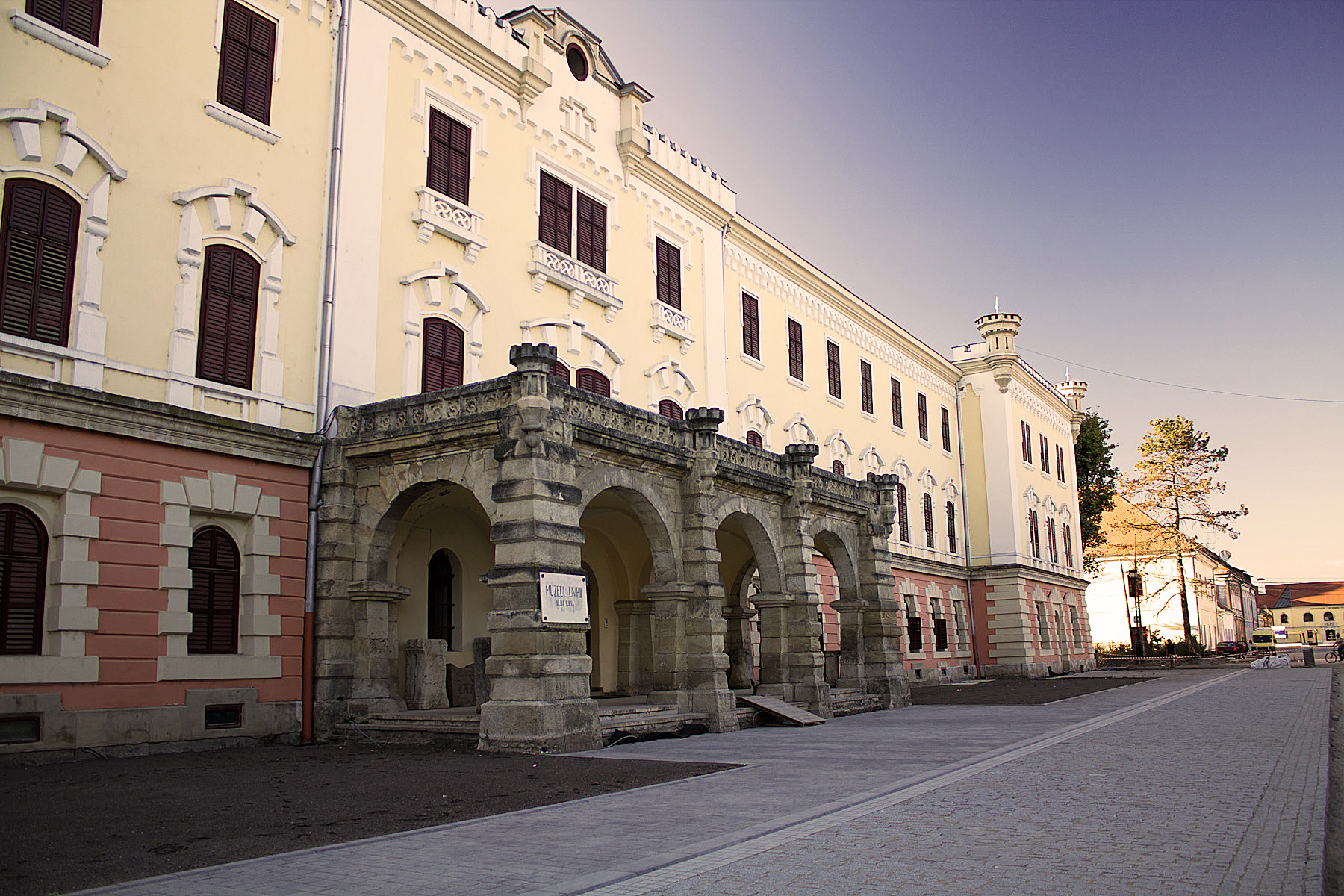
Unirii Museum

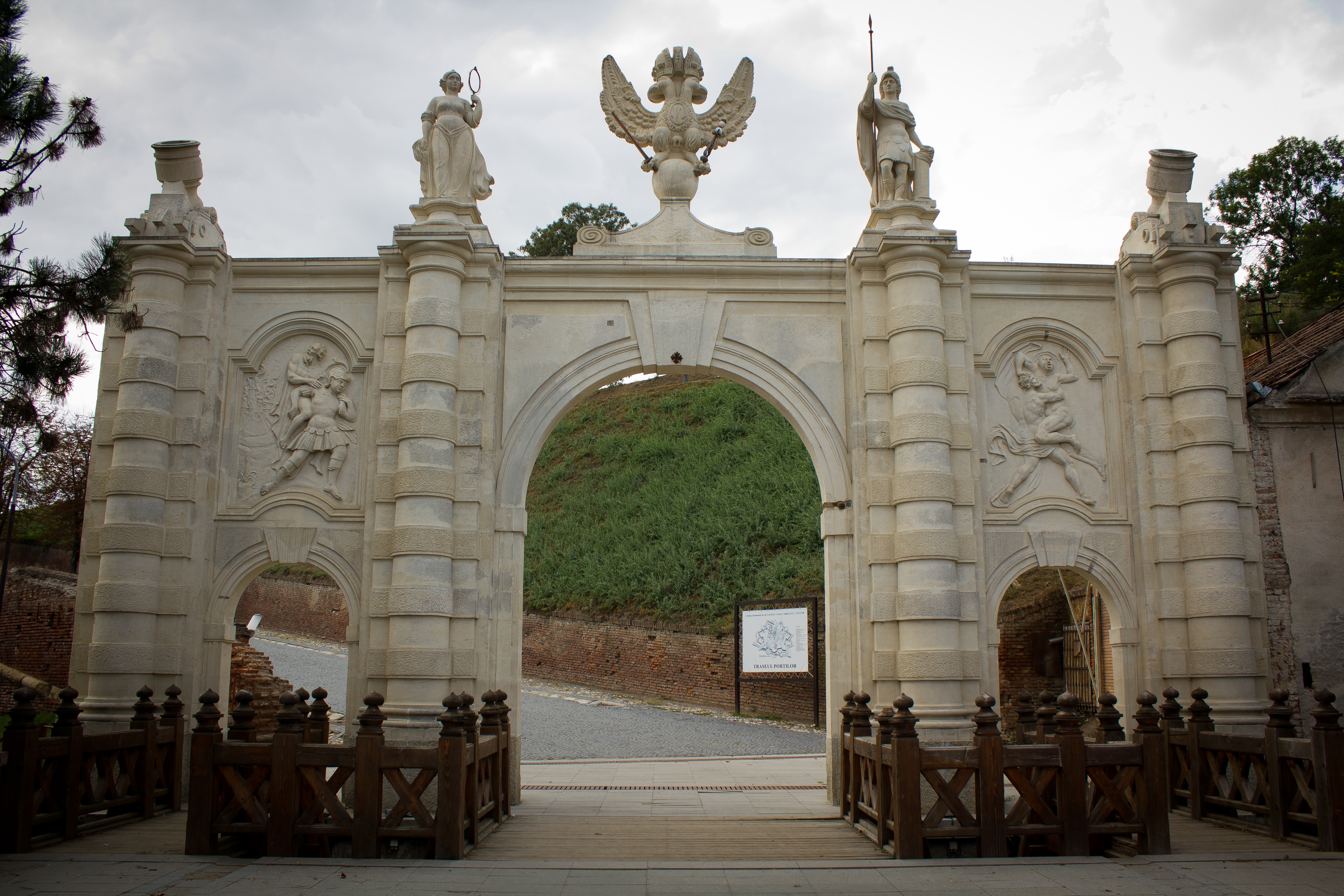
Gate I

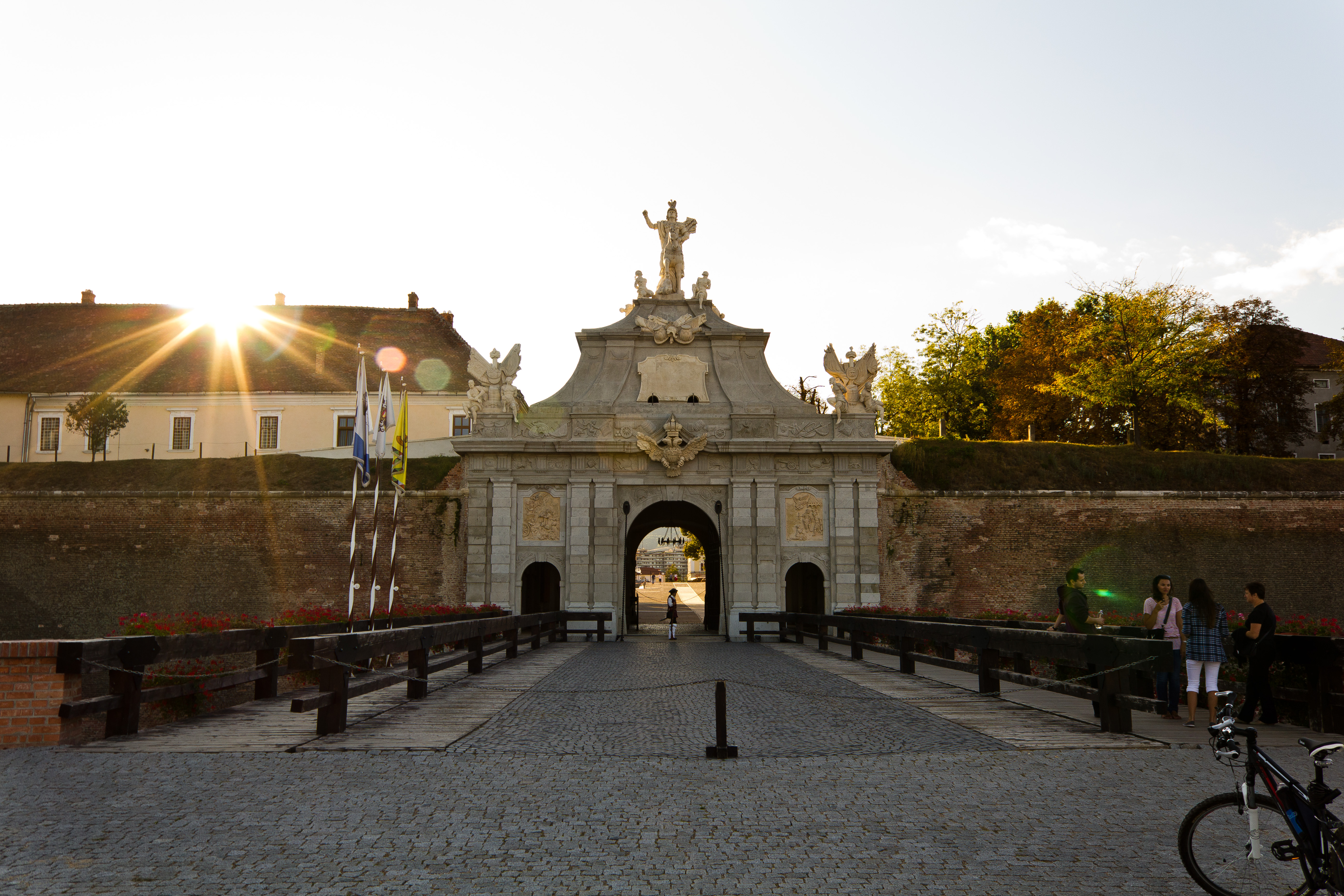
Gate III

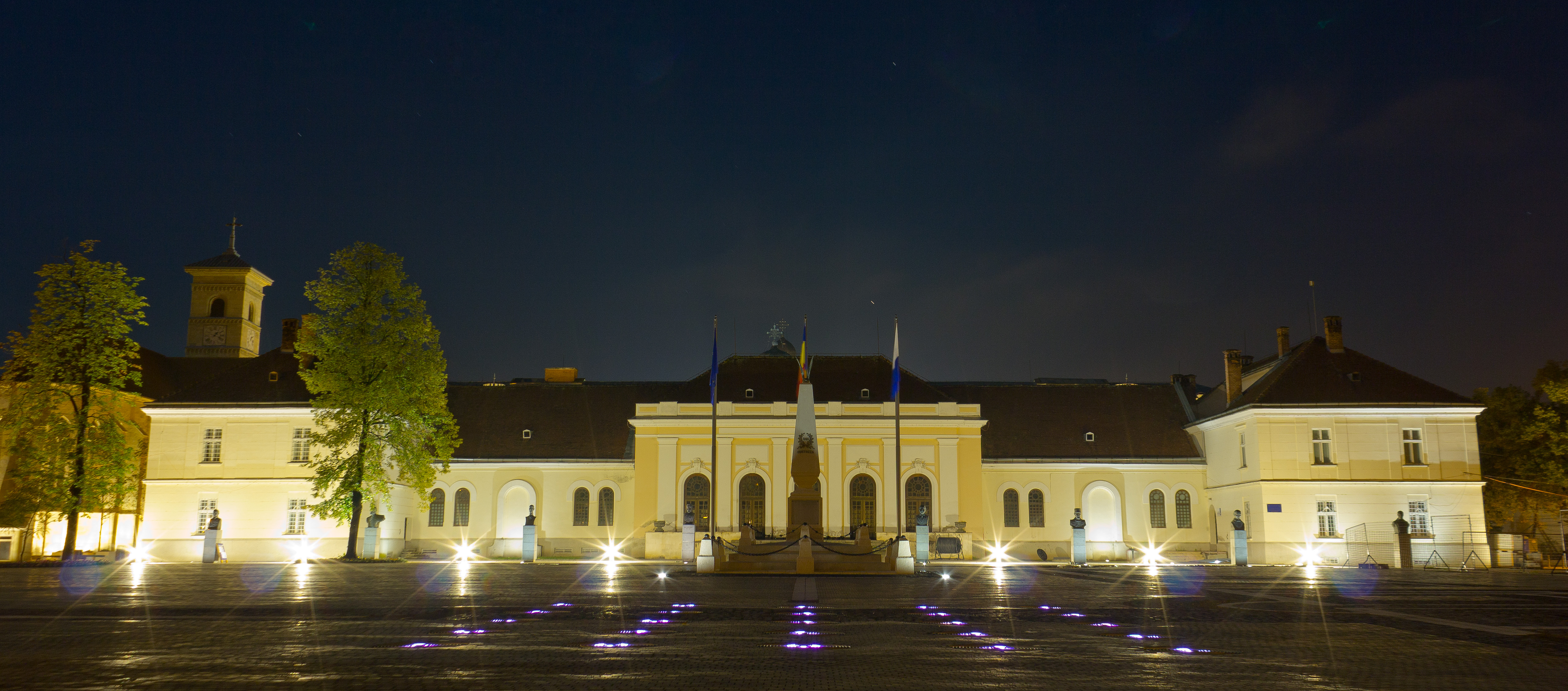
Unirii Hall, view from Custozza Park

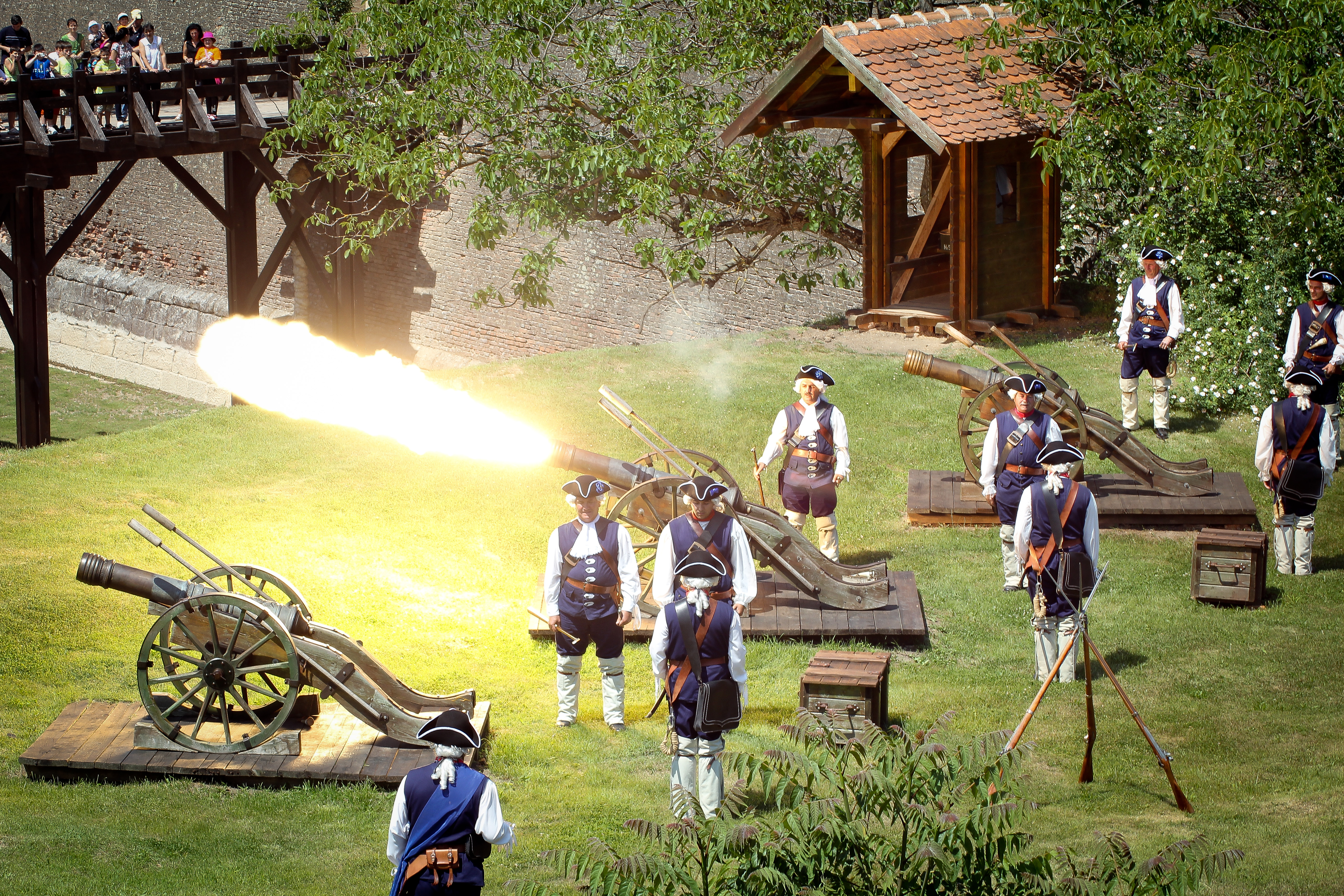
Cannon fire by the citadel's Austrian guard

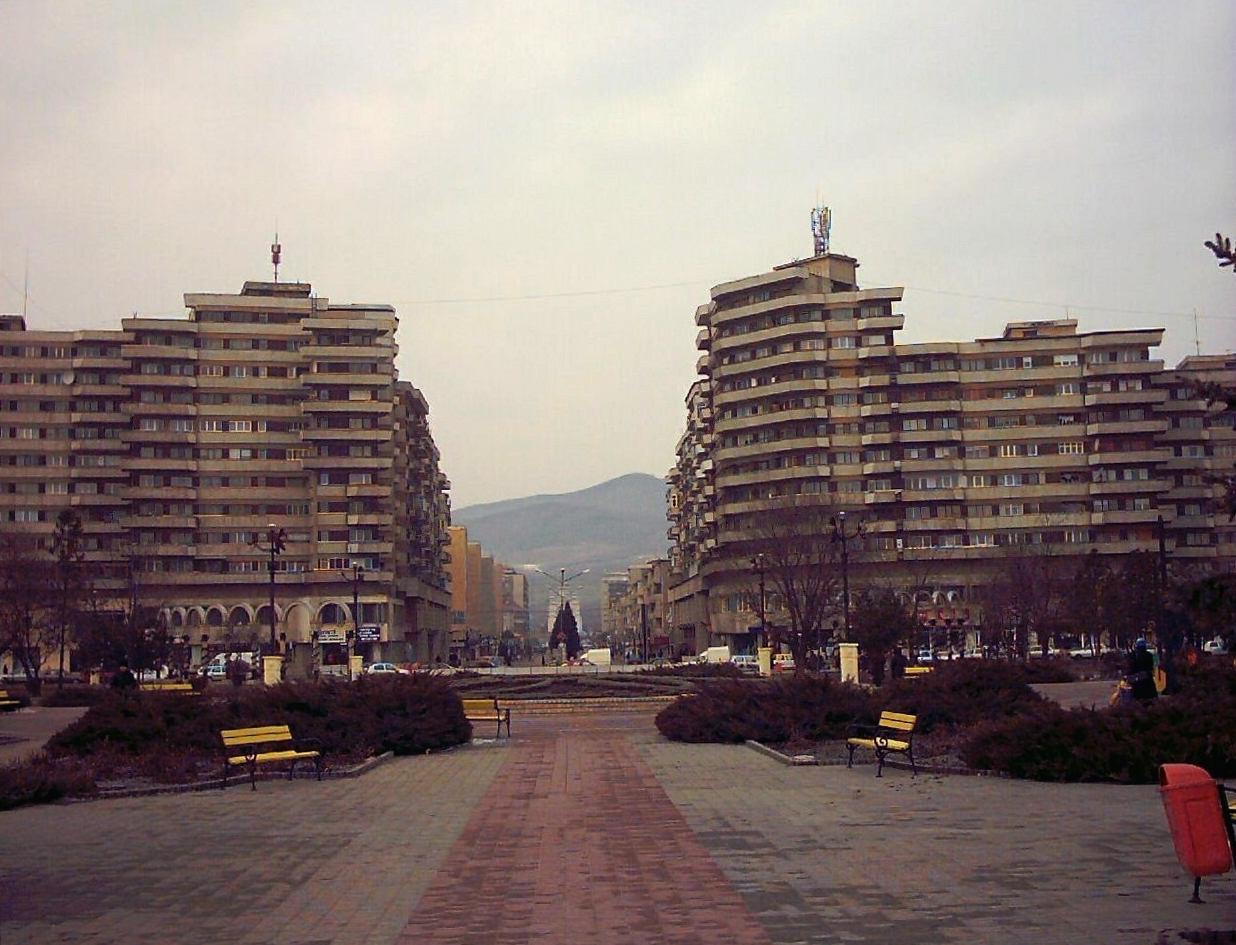
Piața Unirii (Union Square)

== Secondary sources ==
- Makkai, László (2001). "Transylvania in the medieval Hungarian kingdom (896–1526)", In: Béla Köpeczi, Historyof Transylvania Volume I: From the Beginnings to 1606, Columbia University Press, New York, 2001, ISBN 0880334797
