= Ernst Michael Mangel =

Hungarian musician

Ernst Michael Mangel (1800, Karlsburg, Transylvania – 13 January 1887, Athens, Greece) was a Hungarian musician, composer, and philhellene, who became the director of the first military band of Revolutionary Greece and the Greek Kingdom.

== Biography ==
Ernst Mangel was born in 1800 in the Transylvanian city of Gyulafehérvár (in German: Karlsburg, in Romanian: Alba Iulia). There is no information about his youth and early musical education in Gyulafehérvár. After the outbreak of the Greek Revolution in 1821, Mangel joined the movement of Philhellenism, and in 1823 he went to Greece to fight alongside the Greeks. In 1824, Mangel and his father arrived in Missolonghi, where they entered the regular brigade which was under formation under the auspices of Lord Byron.

After Byron's death, he followed the French philhellene, Colonel Charles Nicolas Fabvier, who was tasked with creating a regular army. From then on, Mangel's activity is known by the Greek fighter and writer Christos Vyzantios. According to Vyzantios, Mangel was a German from the Kingdom of Württemberg, who had served before as a lieutenant in the French Army. As part of the first regular regiment, Fabvier organized a military band, called the Musical Troupe (Μουσικός Θίασος), and entrusted its direction to Mangel. Under the command of Fabvier, Mangel and his band took part in the Athens campaign of 1825, and in expeditions the islands of Euboea and Chios.

In 1828, with the arrival of the first Governor of Greece, John Kapodistrias, Mangel and his orchestra settled in Nafplion, the then capital of Greece. After the liberation of Greece and with the establishment of a monarchy under the Bavarian prince Otto, the orchestra initially remained in Nafplion, but then, on the arrival of Bavarian military bands, was transferred to nearby Argos. In 1834 Mangel converted to Greek Orthodoxy, choosing the name "Michael", married a local woman, and left the army.

Following the establishment in 1843 of a Music School in Athens, Mangel was recalled to active service and appointed the School's director. At the same time Mangel wrote military marches on the basis of Greek folk music and adapted European marches for local use. Later, Mangel was promoted to musical inspector and retired in 1870 with the rank of Major.

== Works ==
Manuscripts of three triumphal marches dedicated to King Otto, are stored in the Bavarian State Library in the city of Munich.

== Sources ==
- Konstantin Soter Kotsowilis: Die Griechenbegeisterung der Bayern unter König Otto I. München 2007
- Emanuel Turczynski: Sozial- und Kulturgeschichte Griechenlands im 19. Jahrhundert. Von der Hinwendung zu Europa bis zu den ersten Olympischen Spielen der Neuzeit. Mannheim und Möhnesee 2003
