= Apulum (conurbation) =

- Alba Iulia; Gyulafehérvár; Karlsburg; colonia Aurelia Apulensis, municipium Aurelium Apulense, Chrysopolis, Municipium Septimium Apulense, Apulum I, Apulum II
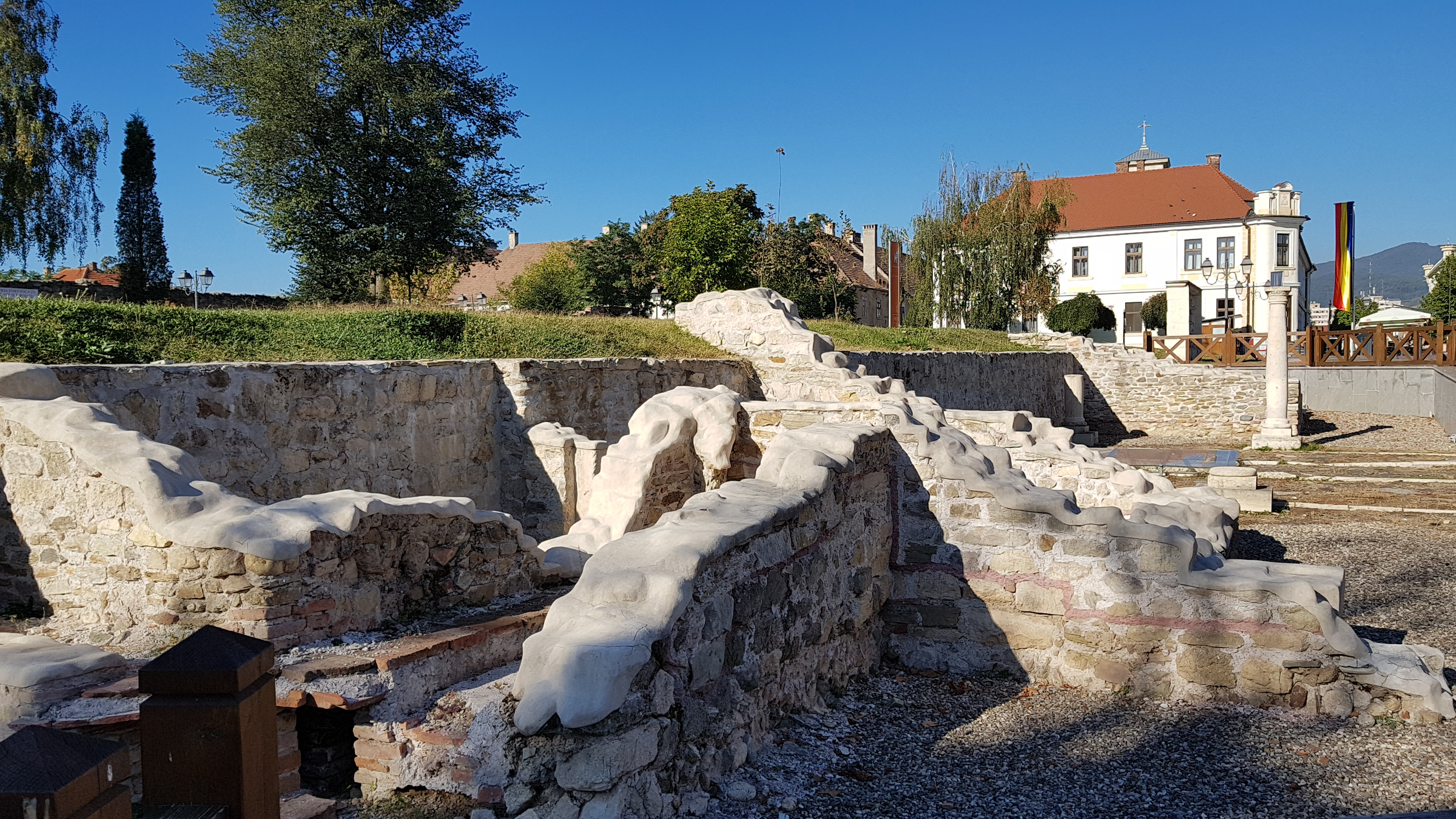
- castrum Apulum

- Location within Romania
- 46.0679°N 23.5727°E
- Location: Alba Iulia, Romania

History
- Founded: 107 – 108
- Built: Trajan
- Abandoned: 4th century AD

Site notes
- Elevation: 245 m (804 ft)
- Archaeologists: B. Csérni

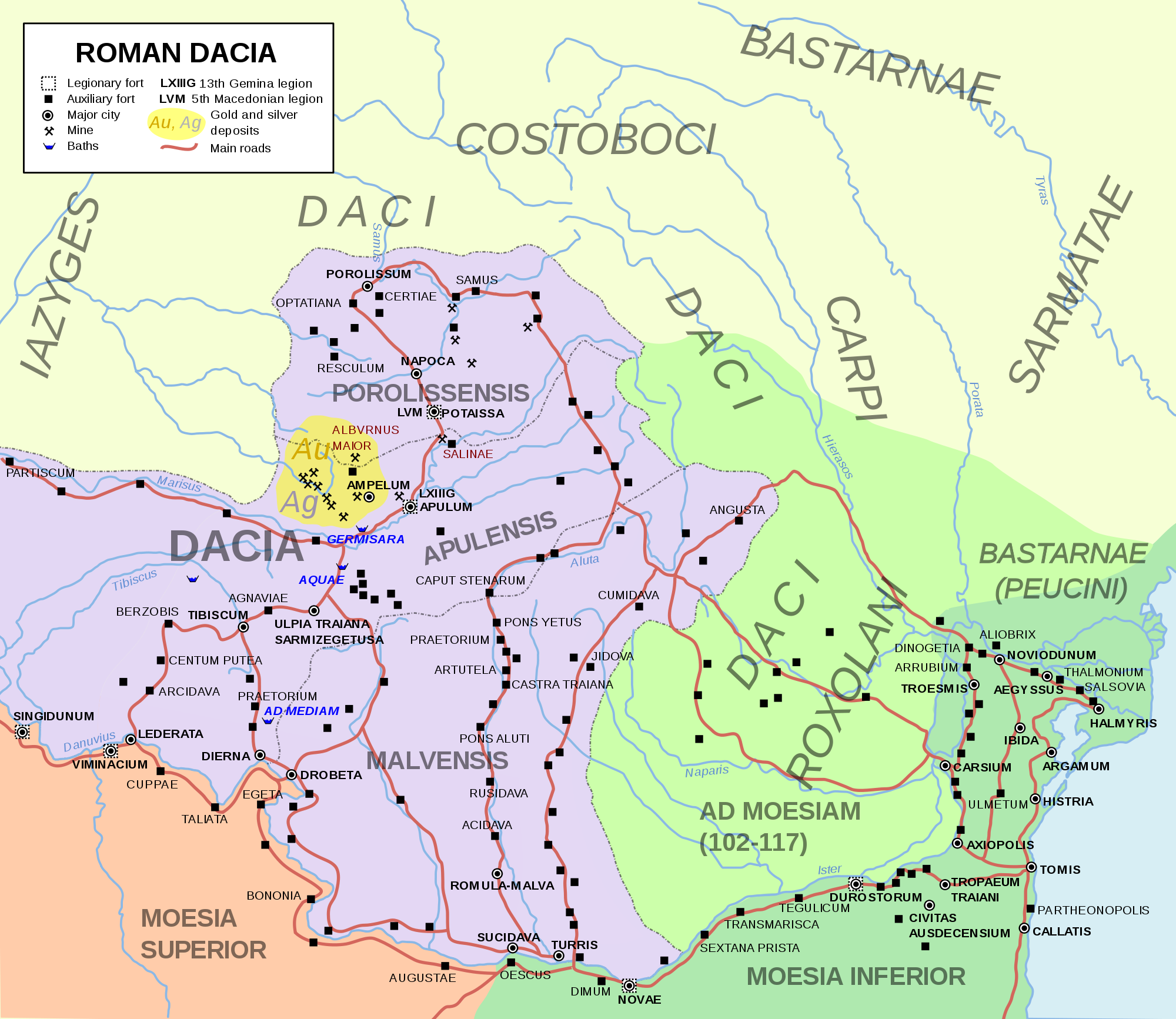
Dacia

The twin towns of Apulum were a major urban centre of Roman Dacia, nowadays completely covered by the city of Alba Iulia. They developed in the vicinity of the legionary fortress of Legio XIII Gemina: Colonia Aurelia Apulensis and Colonia Nova Apulensis.

The conurbation extended over 140 ha in the 3rd century with an estimated population between 15,000 and 20,000. The two towns and the castrum, commonly referred together as Apulum, had numerous temples including five or six Mithraea and hosted the residence of the governor in charge of the Legio XIII Gemina and Legio V Macedonica, making it a de facto capital of the province of Dacia Apulensis and all of Roman Dacia after the residence had been moved from Sarmizegetusa.

== Apulum I ==
Colonia Aurelia Apulensis was located south of the fortress on the bank of Marisus river and started as a pagus of Trajan's colony Ulpia Traiana Sarmizegetusa. It was upgraded to municipium Aurelium Apulense by Marcus Aurelius. During emperor Commodus' reign its status was again raised to colonia, and at the beginning of the third century functioned under ius italicum. Partly due to its connection to gold mining, partly as a result of its emulation for and rivalry with Sarmizegetusa which gained the status of metropolis around the same time, it was granted the epithet Chrysopolis meaning "Golden City" under the rule of Trebonianus Gallus.

The town was situated on the road south from the fort and on the bank of Maris river, making it one of the most important trade nodes of the province. Goods and slaves from the Empire passed through from the south, and from the north salt, gold, and silver from the province's mines. A small harbour also functioned allowing a waterway connection to the rest of the Empire.

== Apulum II ==
Colonia Nova Apulensis developed closer to the fortress and was probably created by Septimius Severus (193-211) and initially named municipium Septimium Apulense. It was also raised to a colonia.

The town was the site of the governor's palace in Dacia after the seat was moved from Sarmizegetusa around 158 under Antoninus Pius and was one of the most extensive buildings of its type in the Roman Empire, complete with thermae, cult places, and staff offices and residences.

== After 271 ==
In the Aurelian Retreat, the legion, the elite and probably the merchants suddenly left the conurbation. A remaining part of the population and the emerging barbarian groups inhabited the ex-Roman city only temporarily after 271. With this, the urban culture ceased to exist.

Between the 6th and 9th centuries, the territory where the castrum and Nova Apulensis once laid was repopulated, the initial settlement becoming known as Belgrad. In the construction of the Early Medieval city of Bălgrad, Roman stones were re-used for the first time as the unenduring provincial architecture collapsed naturally even before the Hungarian conquest.

== Gallery ==
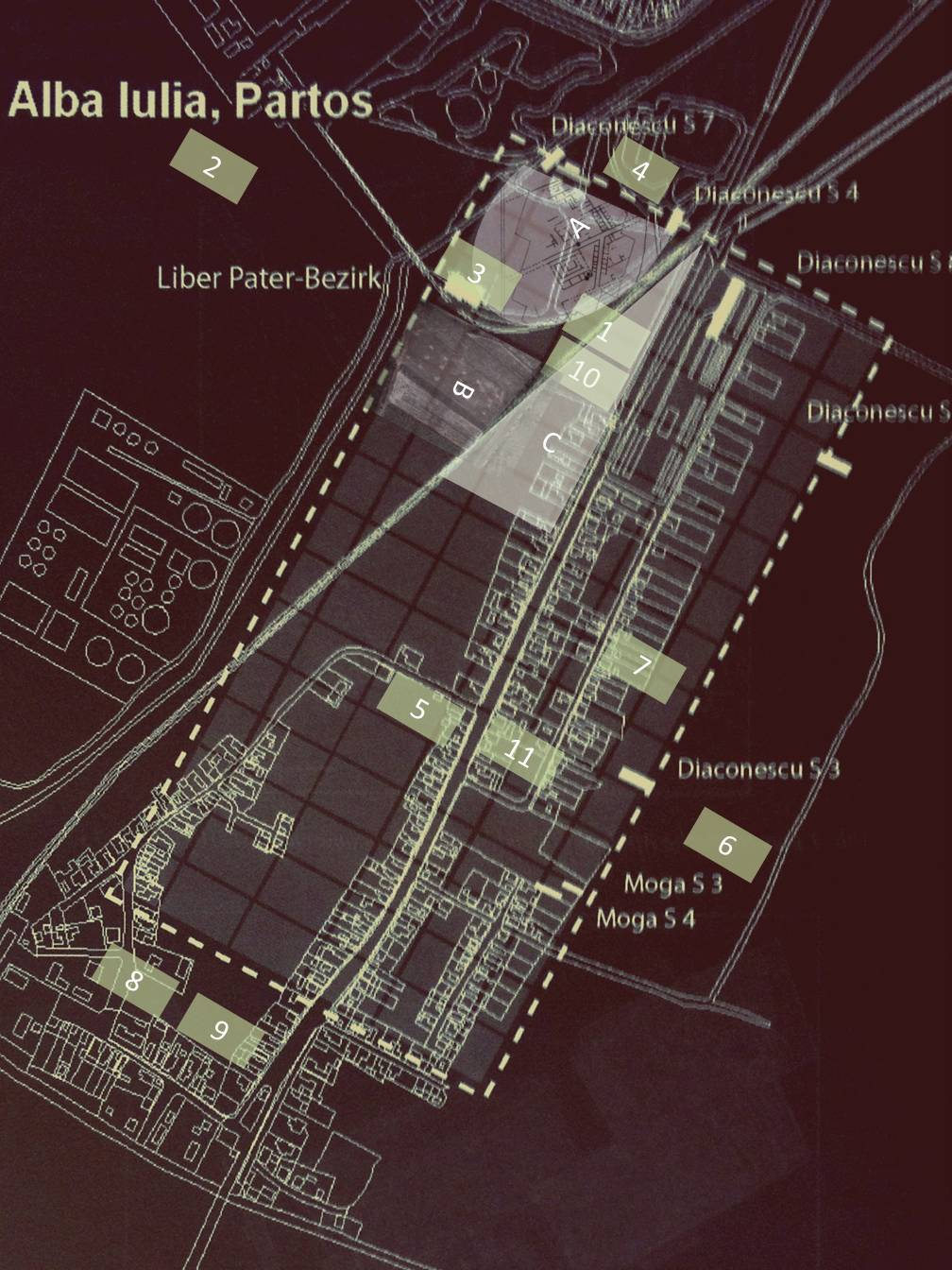
Colonia Aurelia Apulensis

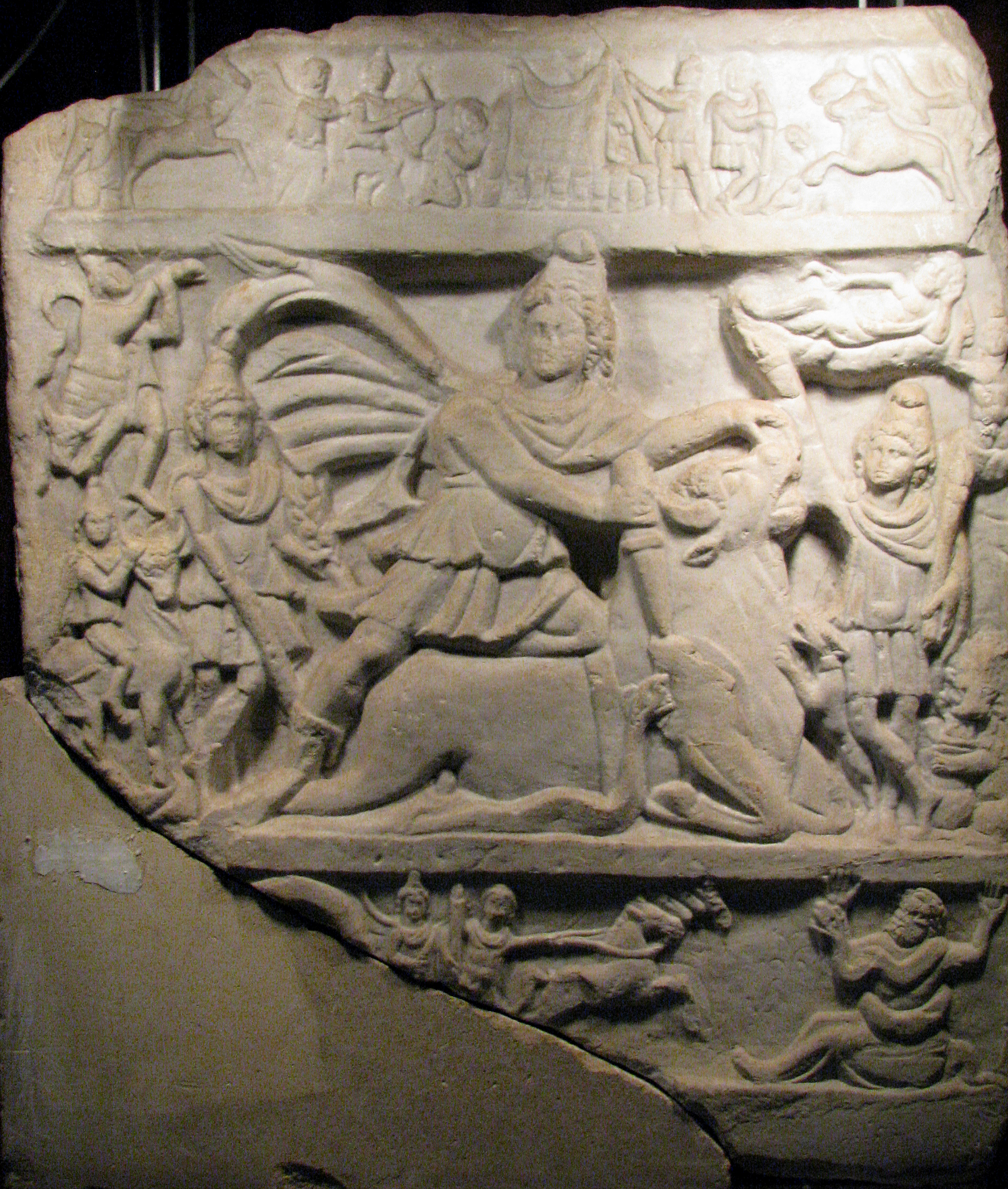
Alba Iulia National Museum of the Union 2011 - Mithras Cult Relief, Apulum

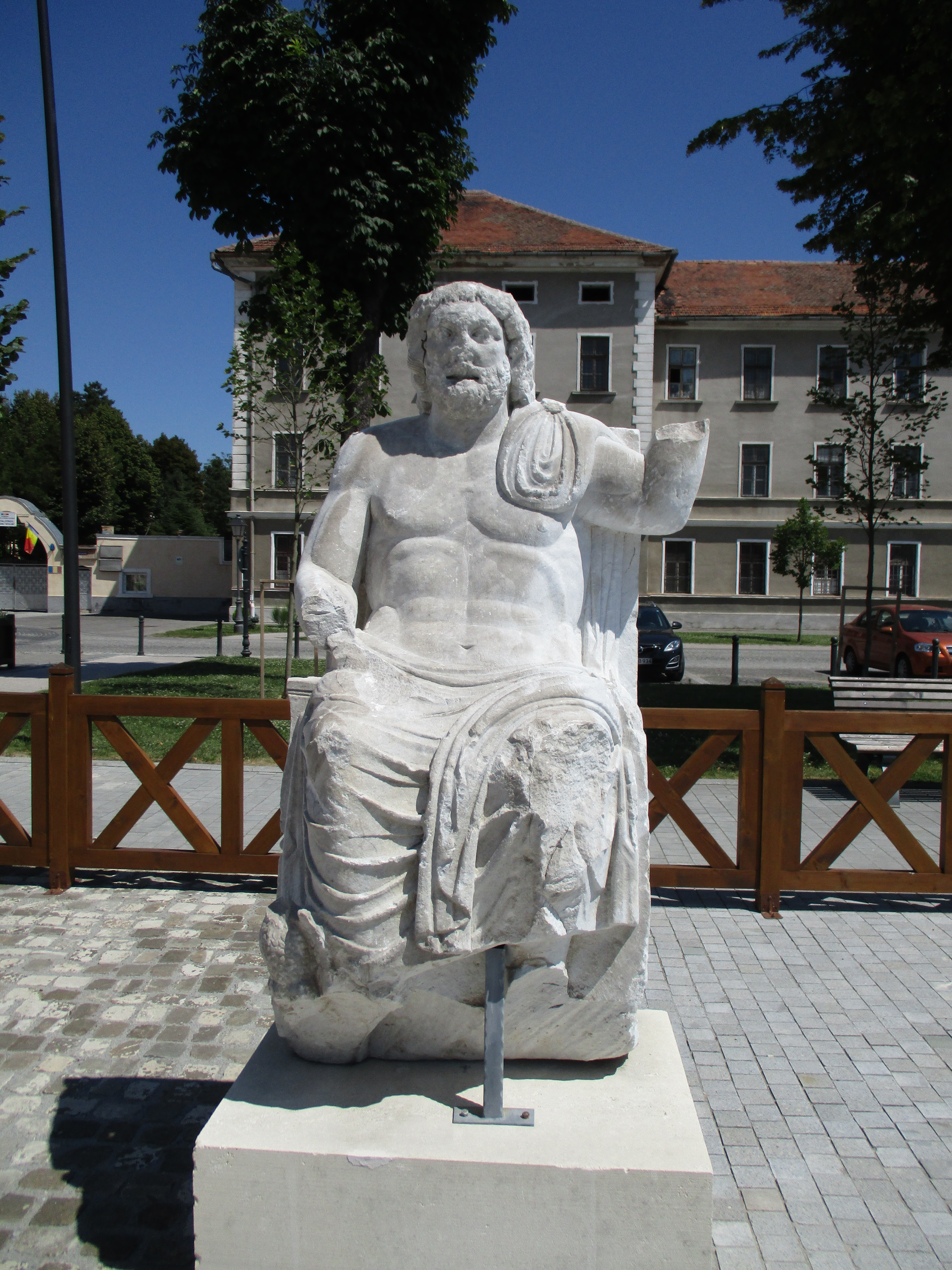
Statue of Jupiter Optimus Maximus from Apulum
