= Rudolf Züllich =

Hungarian sculptor

Rudolf Züllich (1813 in Gyulafehérvár – 1890 in Cairo) was a Hungarian sculptor noted for his classicist style. He is best known for his bust of József Katona.

After studying sculpture and working in Vienna and Rome, he returned to Pest and in 1846 modelled Juno a 132 cm tall white marble statue. Many of his busts are in the Hungarian National Gallery in Budapest. The following years of his life saw him in Kolozsvár, Paris, Sicily and towards his later years in Egypt where he died in Cairo in 1890.
