= Apulum (castra) =

Ancient Roman legionary fort in Dacia, modern Romania

- Castra of Alba Iulia; Apula, Apulon
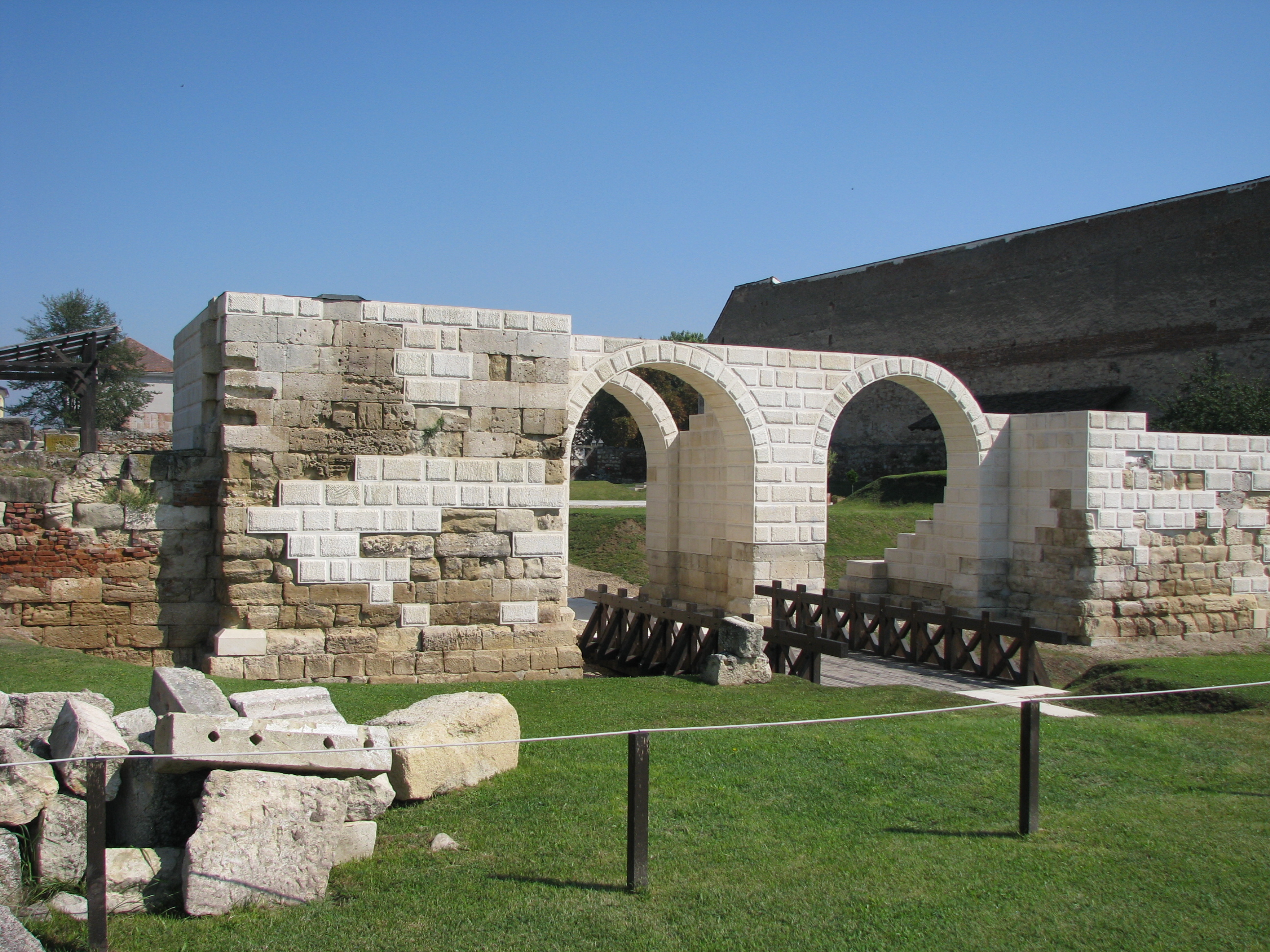
- Porta Principalis Dextra

- Location within Romania
- 46°02′50″N 23°34′0″E
- Location: Alba Iulia, Alba, Romania

History
- Founded: 107 – 108
- Built: Trajan
- Abandoned: 4th century AD

Site notes
- Elevation: 245 m (804 ft)
- Condition: Ruined

Apulum was a legionary fortress in the Roman province of Dacia from the 2nd to 4th centuries AD, located in today's Alba Iulia, Romania.

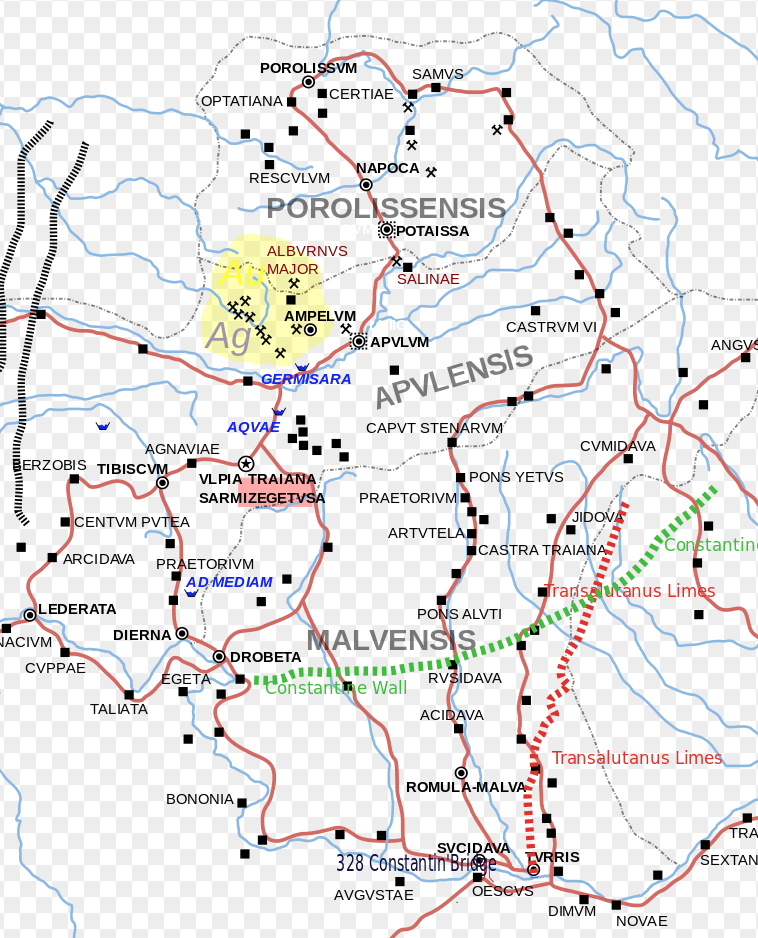
Western Dacia map

It is the largest castrum in Romania, occupying 37.5 hectares (93 acres) (750 x 500 m). It was the base of the legion Legio XIII Gemina transferred there by Trajan to the newly conquered province of Dacia at the end of the war in 106. In the era of Hadrian (117-138 AD) and of Antoninus Pius (138-161 AD) it was rebuilt in stone.

The city of Apulum grew up around the fortress, eventually becoming the capital of Roman Dacia.

The legion was relocated in 271 to Dacia Aureliana when the northern Dacia province was evacuated.

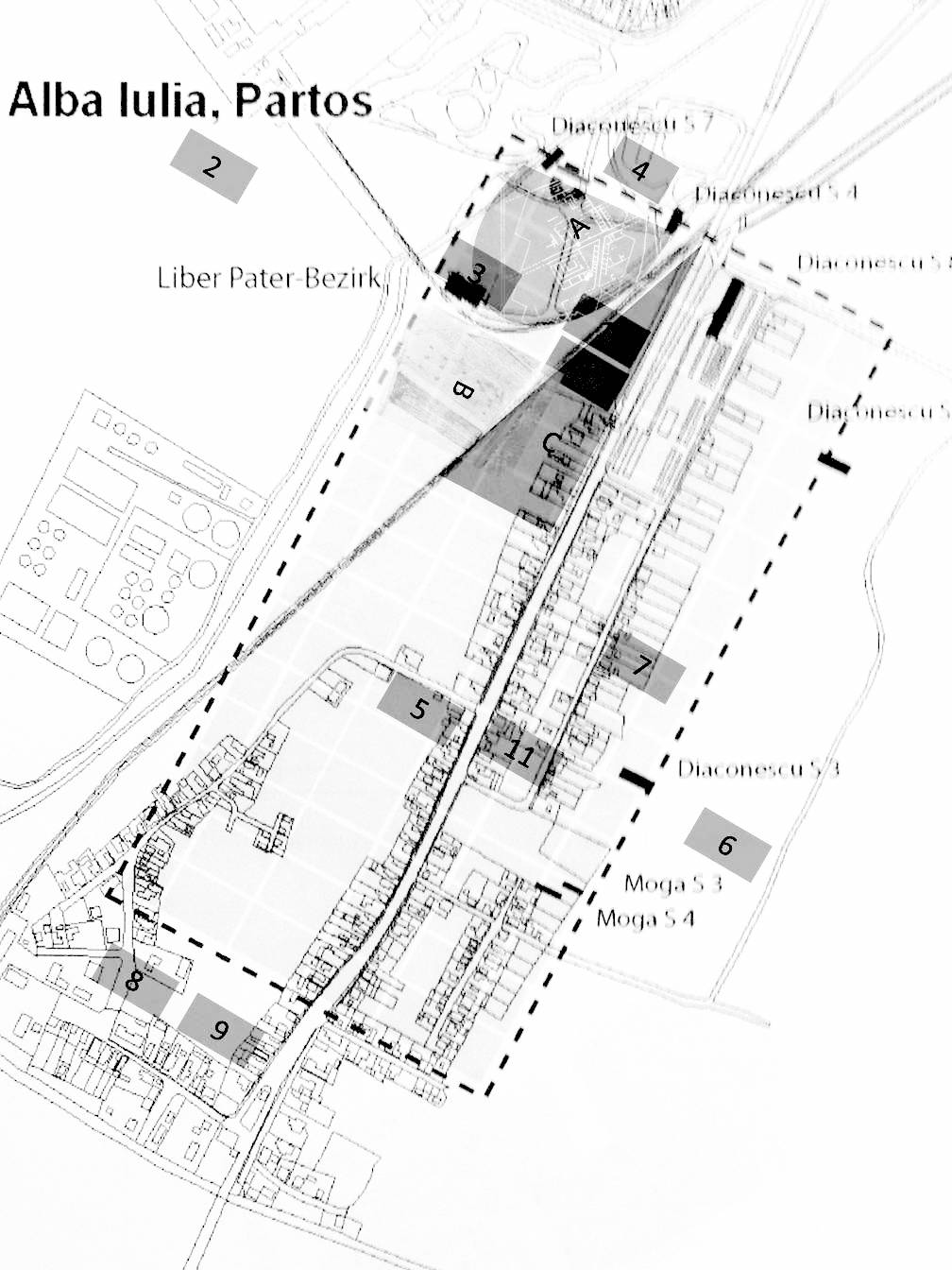
Apulum

== Types of coins discovered in Apulum ==
Issuer	Issue Date	Type
Antoninus Pius	139	sestertius
Julia Maesa	218–224	denarius
Elagabalus	222	denarius
Severus Alexander	223–225	denarius
Sallustia Orbiana	225–227	denarius
Gordian III	241–243	denarius
Philip the Arab	244–247	antoninianus
Cornelia Salonina	257–258	antoninianus

== See also ==
- List of castra
- Apulum (ancient city)
- Apulon
