= List of ancient tribes in Thrace and Dacia =

This is a list of ancient tribes in Thrace and Dacia (Ancient Greek: Θρᾴκη, Δακία) including possibly or partly Thracian or Dacian tribes, and non-Thracian or non-Dacian tribes that inhabited the lands known as Thrace and Dacia. A great number of Ancient Greek tribes lived in these regions as well, albeit in the Greek colonies.

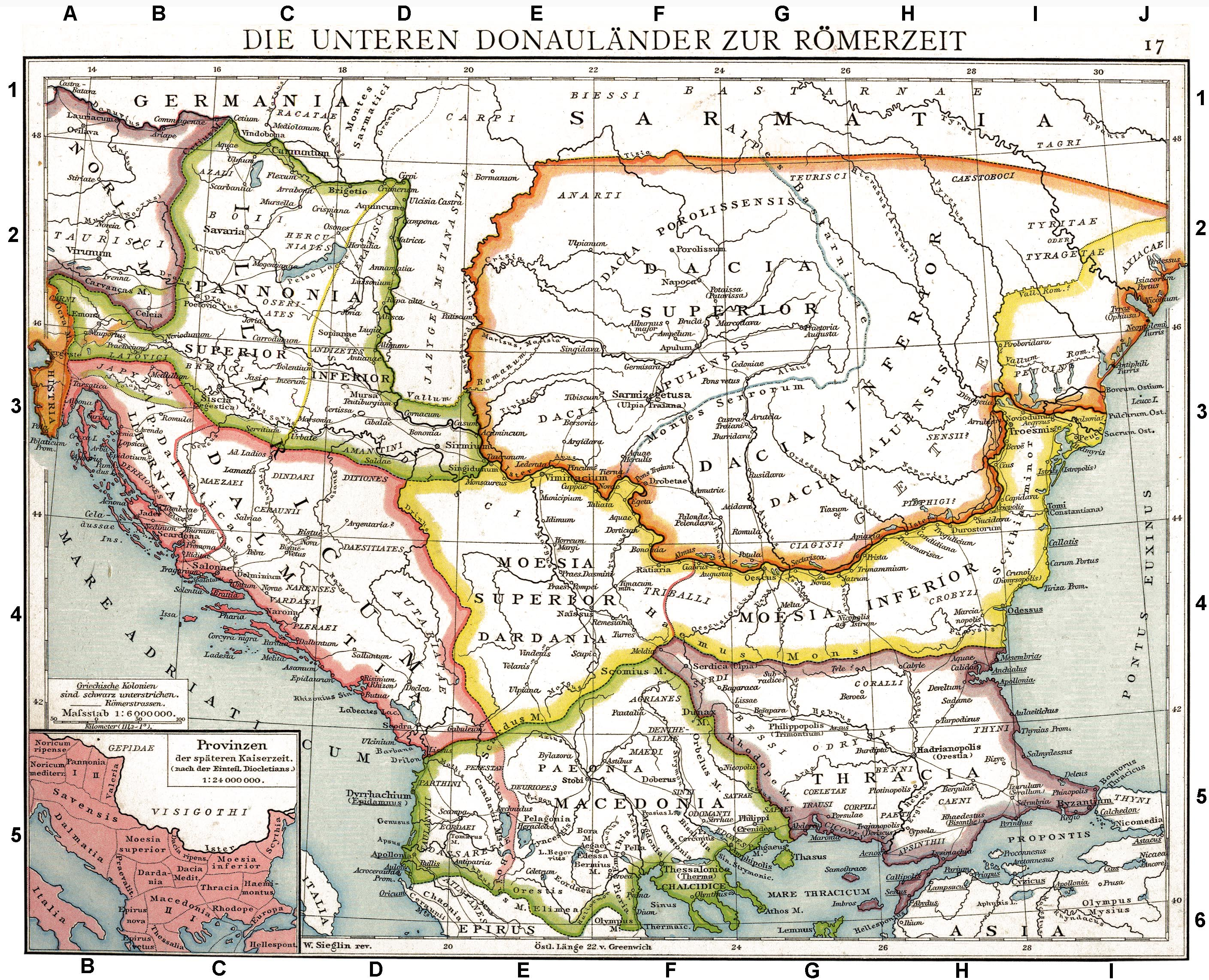
1886 map of tribes in Dacia and Thrace, cities and regions .

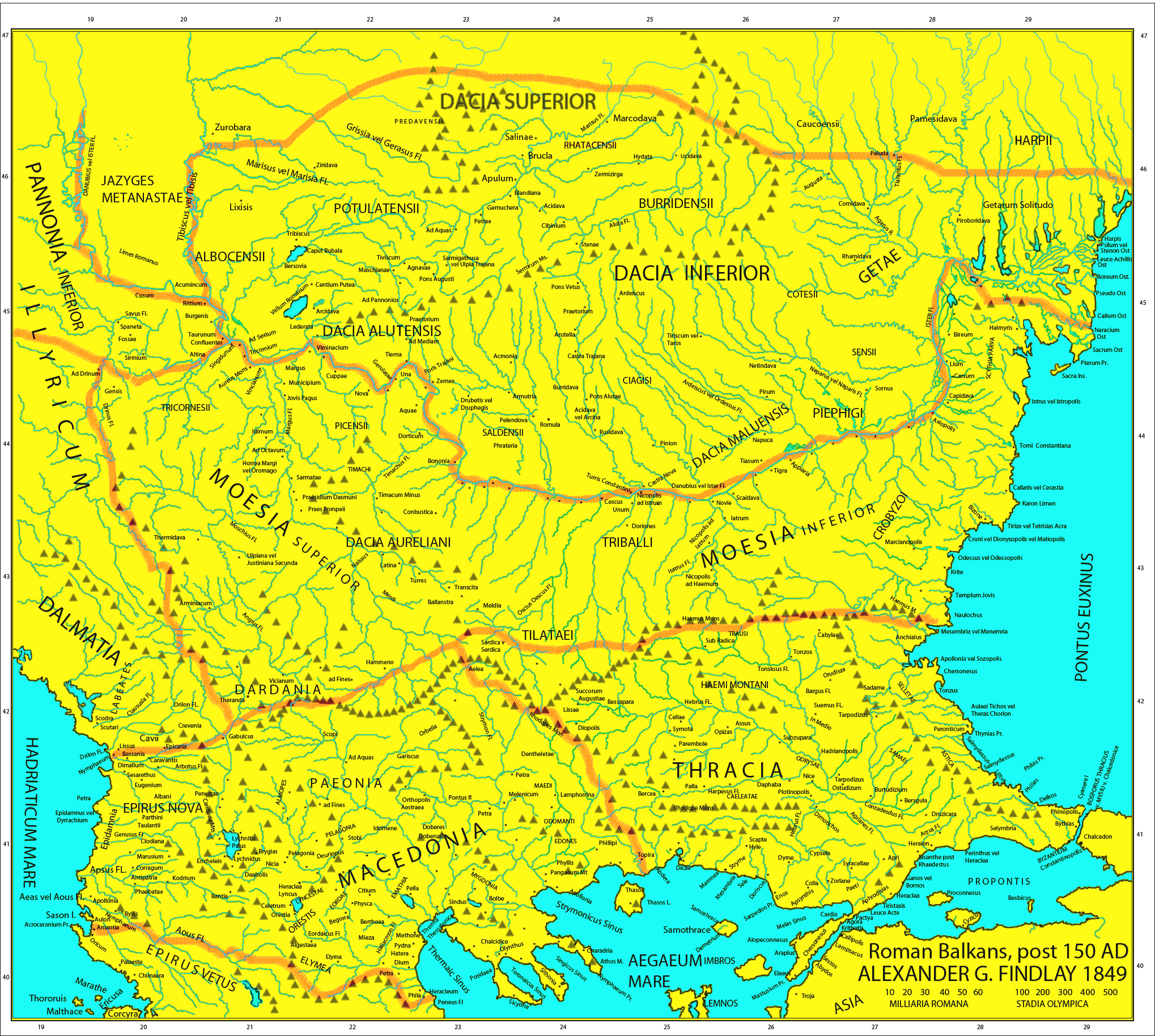
1849 map of Roman regions, fortresses and tribes in Thrace and Dacia (about 150 AD)

== Tribes ==
=== Thracian ===
Certain tribes and subdivisions of tribes were named differently by ancient writers but modern research points out that these were in fact the same tribe. The name Thracians itself seems to be a Greek exonym and we have no way of knowing what the Thracians called themselves. Also certain tribes mentioned by Homer are not indeed historical.

- Agrianes
- Apsynthii
- Artakioi
- Astae, they appear in the 2nd century BC to 1st century BC
- Bebryces
- Beni
- Bessi
- Bisaltae
- Bistones
- Bithyni or Bythini, migrated to Asia minor
- Brenae
- Crousi
- Cebrenii
- Coelaletae
- Dersaei
- Edones
- Dentheletae
- Derrones
- Digeri
- Dii
- Diobesi
- Dolonci
- Kainoi
- Kikones, mentioned by Homer in Odyssey
- Coreli
- Corpili
- Krestones
- Krobyzoi, perhaps Getae
- Maduateni
- Maedi
- MaedoBythini, Maedi that migrated to Asia minor
- Melanditae
- Melinophagi
- Mygdonia
- Nipsaei
- Odomanti
- Odrysae
- Paeti
- Pieres
- Sapaei, close to Abdera, ruled Thrace after the Odrysians
- Satri Satrae
- Sycaeboae
- Scyrmiadae
- Sintians
- Sithones
- Thyni, migrated to Asia minor
- Tilataei
- Tralles
- Tranipsae
- Trausi
- Treres
- Triballi

=== Geto-Dacian ===
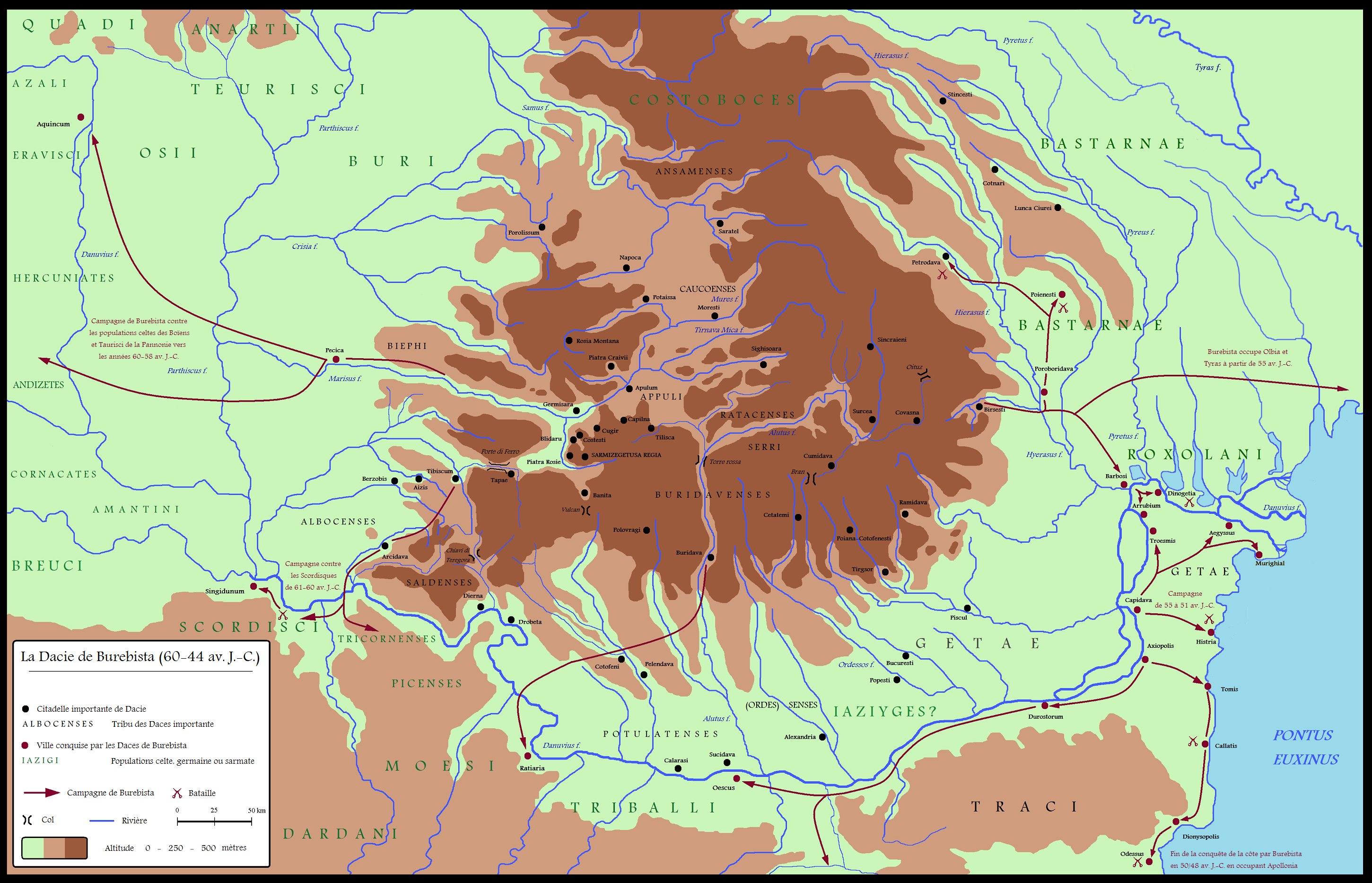
Dacian tribes.

- Aedi
- Albocenses
- Anarti
- Apuli (Appuli), with the center at Apulon
- Biephi
- Biessoi were a Dacian tribe, among the enemies of the Romans in the Marcomannic Wars (166-180 AD), according to Julius Capitolinus"
- Buredeenses
- Buri, their capital was Buridava
- Carpi
- Caucoenses or Cauci
- Ciaginsi
- Clariae
- Coertoboci also Koistobokoi and Koistobokoi Montanoi
- Crobidae,
- Daci
- Getae
- Napae, Dacianized Scythian tribe, after whom the city of Napoca is possibly named
- Osi were a Dacian tribe but it is also argued that it was Germanic or Celtic. It was among the enemies of the Romans in the Marcomannic Wars (166-180 AD), according to Julius Capitolinus"
- Piephigi
- Potulatenses
- Predasenses
- Rhadacenses
- Sabokoi were a Dacian tribe, among the enemies of the Romans in the Marcomannic Wars (166-180 AD), according to Julius Capitolinus"
- Saldenses
- Scaugdae
- Sense
- Suci
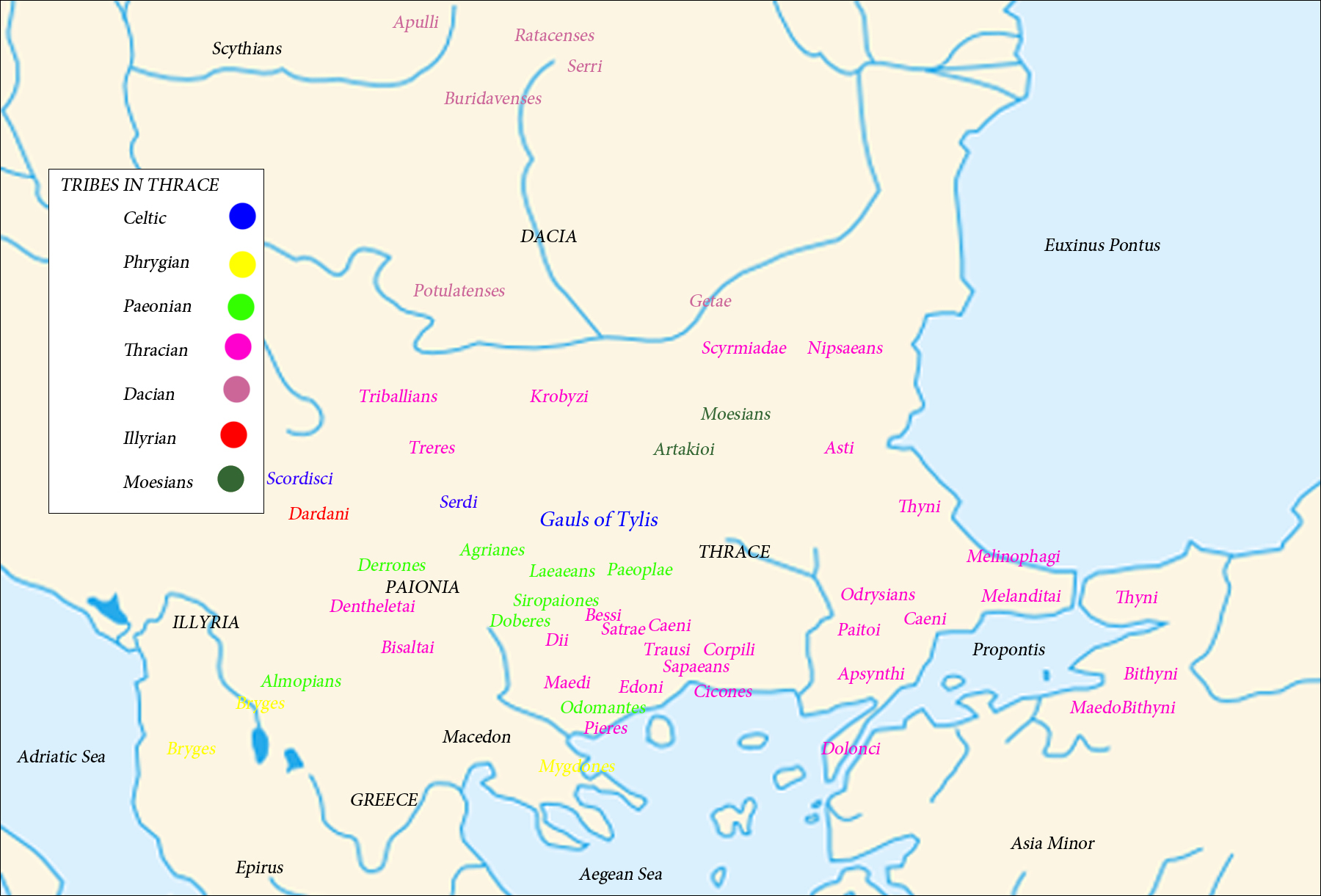
  Tribes in Thrace and neighboring regions
- Terici
- Teurisci
- Trixae
- Tyrageti
- Troglodytae

=== Greek ===
- See Greek colonies in Thrace

=== Phrygian ===
- Bryges
- Mygdones
- Phrygians

=== Celtic and Germanic ===
- Anartoi, Celts assimilated by Dacians
- Bastarnae Celts or Germanics and according to Livy "the bravest nation on earth"
- Boii
- Carpi
- Costoboci
- Eravisci
- Gauls of Tylis
- Peukini
- Scordisci
- Serdi
- Teuriscii, Celts assimilated by Dacians
- Cotense, a Celtic tribe

=== Thracian/Scythian ===
- Agathyrsi

== See also ==
- List of ancient Geto-Dacian, Moesian, Thracian and Paeonian tribes
- List of Illyrian peoples and tribes
- List of ancient tribes in Illyria
- List of ancient cities in Thrace and Dacia
- List of ancient cities in Illyria
- List of rulers of Dacia
- List of rulers of Thrace
- List of rulers of Illyria
- List of kings of Thrace and Dacia
