= Burs (Dacia) =

Dacian tribe

The Burs (Latin Buri, Buredeense and Buridavenses; Greek Βοῦροι) were a Dacian tribe living in Dacia in the 1st and 2nd centuries A.D., with their capital city at Buridava.

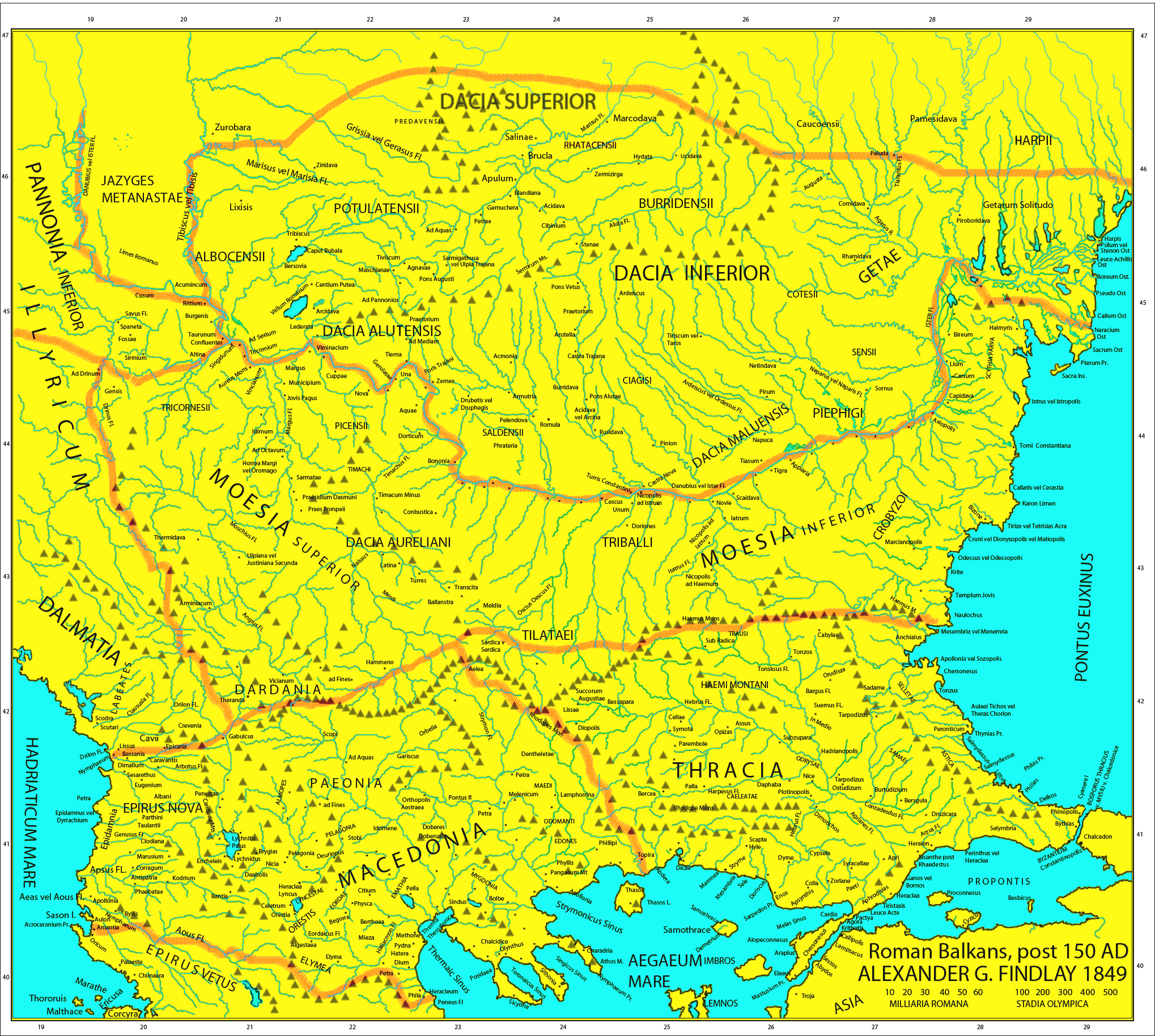
Dacian Buri / Burridensi on the Roman Empire Map

== Name ==
According to Wilhelm Tomaschek, the root bur- is well known with the Dacian Thracian names: i.e. Burus (Thrax), Bουρχέντιος (that is to say Bhūri–Kanta, a Bessian from Thrace), Burebista (the king of Dacians that is maybe related to Sanskrit bhūri "abundant, rich" and Iranian vista "possessor").

== Historical evidence ==
The Dacian tribe Buredeense / Buri is attested by the ninth tabula of Europe of Ptolemy's Geography, Cassius Dio and inscriptions.

Before the battle of Tapae (101) (in the first campaign of Trajan) the Dacian tribe, the Buri, sent Trajan a message to the effect that he should withdraw from Dacia and restore peaceful relations. Their message to him was inscribed on the smooth top of a very large mushroom, in Latin. This message was unusual enough to become part of a frieze on Trajan's Column.

== Identity and distribution ==
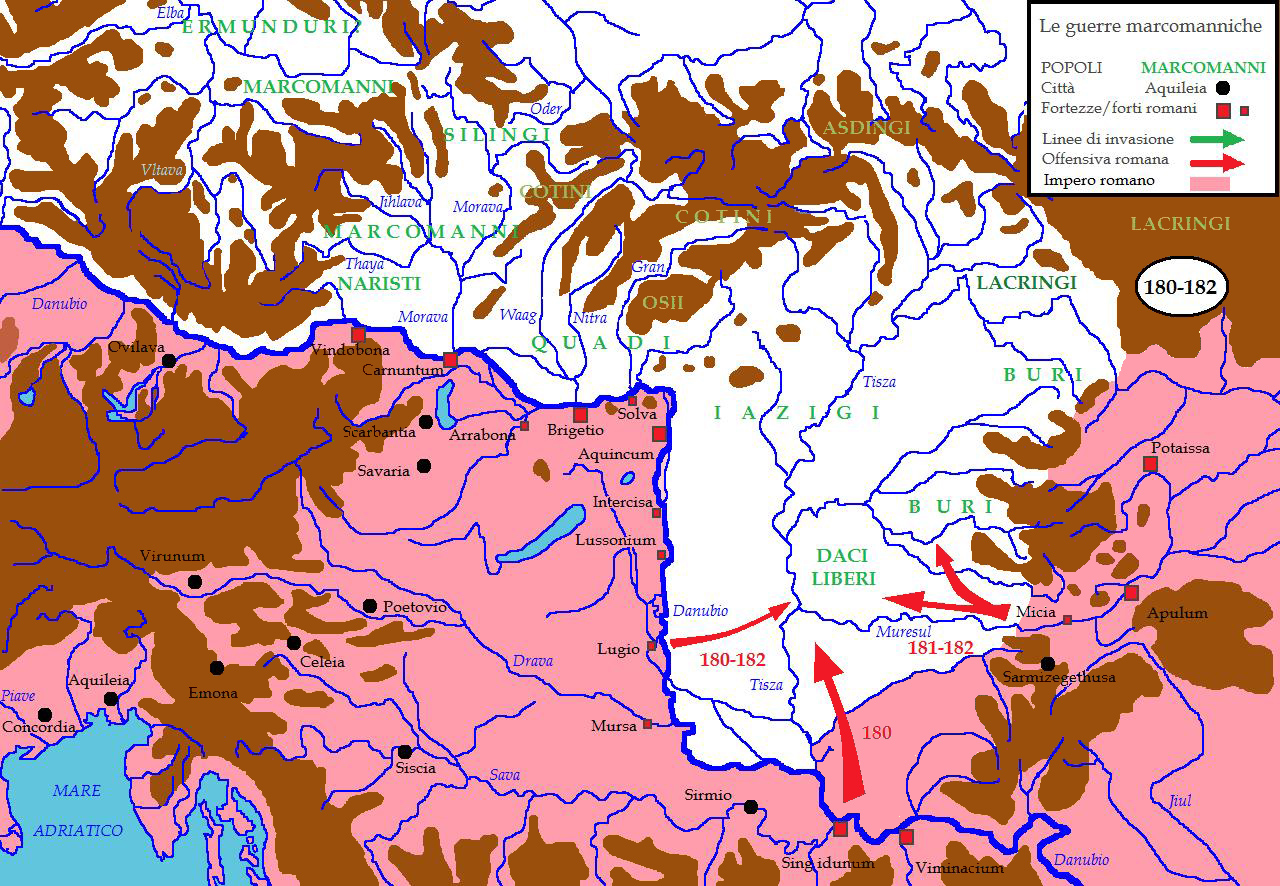
Dacian Buri on the map of Roman operations AD 180–182.

According to Shchukin (1989), Bichir (1976) the tribal union of Buri were part of the Dacian state of Burebista, besides the Daci, the Getae, and the Carpi.

They allied with other tribes in the region to support the efforts by Decebal, the Dacian king, to turn back the Romans. There were two Dacian tribes Buri: one in the later Roman Dacia centered on Buridava and other located to the North West of Dacia (South of Western Carpathians) in the Upper Basin of Tisza. (Note: the Germanic Buri were between the Oder and the Vistula, between Kraków and Opava, in Silesia. They were allies of Trajan, Roman Emperor, in his war against the Dacians, and also of Marcus Aurelius in the Marcomannic Wars.)

The socio-political formation of the Dacians Buri / Buridavensi that was centered on Buridava was located to the North East of Oltenia and Muntenia (modern Vâlcea and Argeş counties) and also on the other side of the Carpathians, in the regions of Sebeş and Făgăraş mountains. This tribal union is documented by the archaeological monetary findings Aninoasa Dobresti. Among other evidences, a fragment of a vase carrying the inscription BUR, discovered at Ocnița, Muntenia, Romania, indicates the name of the tribe or union of tribes, the Buridavensi Dacians.

The Buri of the Upper Basin of Tisza is a part of the Buridavensi that migrated towards North West, where they neighbored the Germanic Quadi. At the new location, ancient sources also list other Dacian tribes: Piegetae, Biessi, Carpians, Arsitae, and Racatae.

The material culture of a mixed Dacian-Germanic origin, known in Slovakia ever since the beginning of the first century AD (at Zemplín, for instance), could represent the population named Buri in historical sources.

== See also ==
- List of Dacian tribes
- Buridava
- Burebista
