= Akrokomai =

Ancient Greek epithet for certain Thracians

Akrokomai, Akrokomoi (Ancient Greek, Ακρόκομοι) an epithet given to certain Thracians by Greeks due to their hair arrangement.

== See also ==
- List of Thracian tribes
