= Sithones =

Sithōnes (Greek: Σίθωνες) is the name of a Thracian tribe.

== See also ==
- Thracian tribes
