= Digeri =

Map showing the Strymon river, the Digeri lived on its left side

Digeri (Greek: "Δίγηροι", Latin: Digerri) was a Thracian tribe that lived on the left side of the Strymon river. They are mentioned by Pliny the Elder and Polybius.

== See also ==
- Thracian tribes
