= Crousi =

Thracian tribe

Map showing Pallene, the west peninsula of Chalkidiki where the Crousi lived

Crousi (Greek: Κρουσαῖοι) is the name of a Thracian tribe that inhabited the Pallene peninsula. They are mentioned by Dionysius of Halicarnassus.

== See also ==
- Thracian tribes
