= Thyni =

Thracian tribe

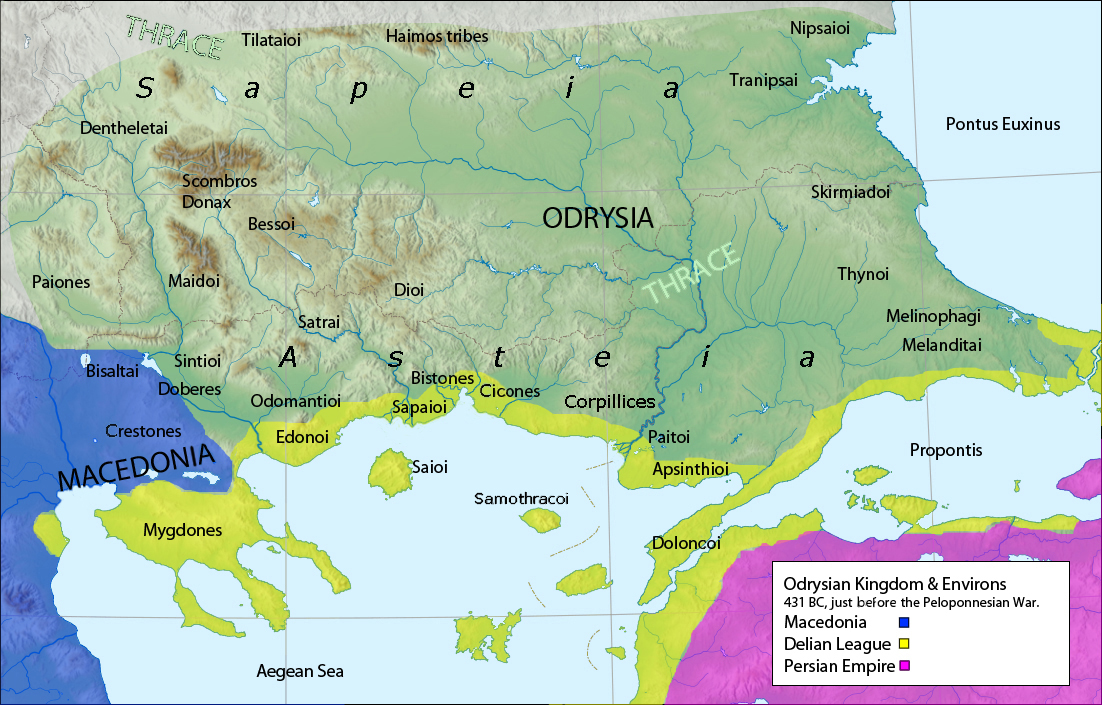
Approximate location of the Thyni

The Thyni (/ˈθaɪˌnaɪ/; Ancient Greek: Θυνοί, romanized: Thunoí; Latin: Thyni) were a large Thracian tribe that lived in southeastern Thrace and northwestern Anatolia.

== Location ==
The Thyni lived between the Propontis and the Black Sea, to the north of Perinthus and Selymbria, as well as in part of the Strandzha Planina and the coast of the Black Sea near Salmydessos until as far as Apollonia and Cape Thynias.

== History ==
A section of the Thyni had migrated into Anatolia along with the Bithyni, who were a Thracian tribe related to the Thyni.

In 513 BCE, the Achaemenid Persian king of kings, Darius I, subdued the Thyni during his conquest of Thrace.

The founder of the Odrysian kingdom, Teres I, conquered the Thyni with great difficulty.

According to Xenophon of Athens, the Thyni, Melanditae and Tranipsae rebelled against the Odrysian king Seuthes II.

In the late 5th century BCE, the Thyni were able to free themselves from Odrysian rule.

== Society ==
=== Sub-tribes ===
The Tranipsae (Ancient Greek: Τρανίψαι, romanized: Tranípsai) were a sub-tribe of the Thyni living in the plain and on the slopes west of the Strandzha Planina.

The Nipsae were likely also a Thynian tribe, and this might possibly have been the case for the Scyrmiadae as well, which is supported by records that these two tribes as well as the Thyni lived around Salmydessos.

A section of the Thyni living near Salmydessos were called the Melinophagi (Μελινοφάγοι, Melinophágoi).

=== Political organisation ===
The Thyni possessed a political organisation which was more developed than a single tribal unit, and which constituted a state not unlike that of the Odrysians.

== Sources ==
- Mihailov, G. [in Bulgarian] (1991). "Thrace Before the Persian Entry into Europe". In Boardman, John; Edwards, I. E. S.; Hammond, N. G. L.; Sollberger, E.; Walker, C. B. F. (eds.). The Cambridge Ancient History. Vol. 3. Cambridge: Cambridge University Press. pp. 591–618. ISBN 978-1-139-05429-4.
