= Nipsai =

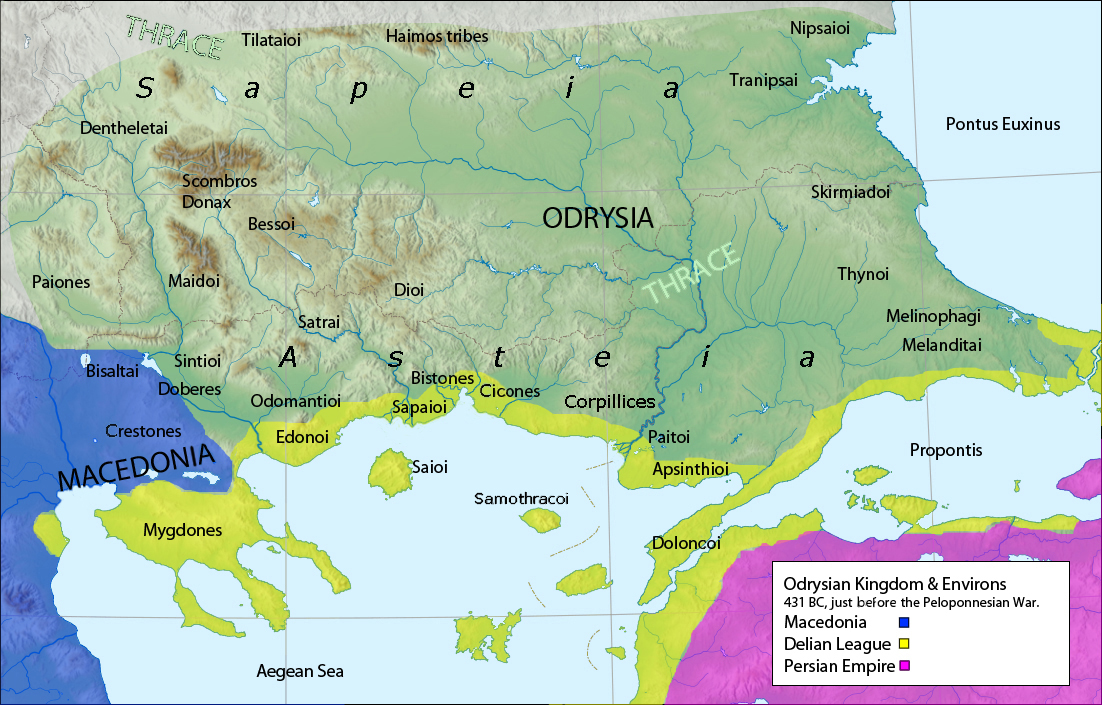
Approximate location of the Nipsai

Nipsai or Nipsaioi (Greek: Νιψαίοι) is the name of a Thracian tribe. They are mentioned by Herodotus.

== See also ==
- Thracian tribes
