= Maduateni =

Ethnicon for the place name Madytus, often erroneously regarded as a small Thracian tribe, mentioned only in Liv. 38,40,7 in connection with the attack by Thracian tribes on Cn. Manlius Vulso in 188 BC.

== See also ==
- Thracian tribes
- Livy
