= Buridava (castra) =

Fort in the Roman province of Dacia, present-day Romania

- Castra of Stolniceni
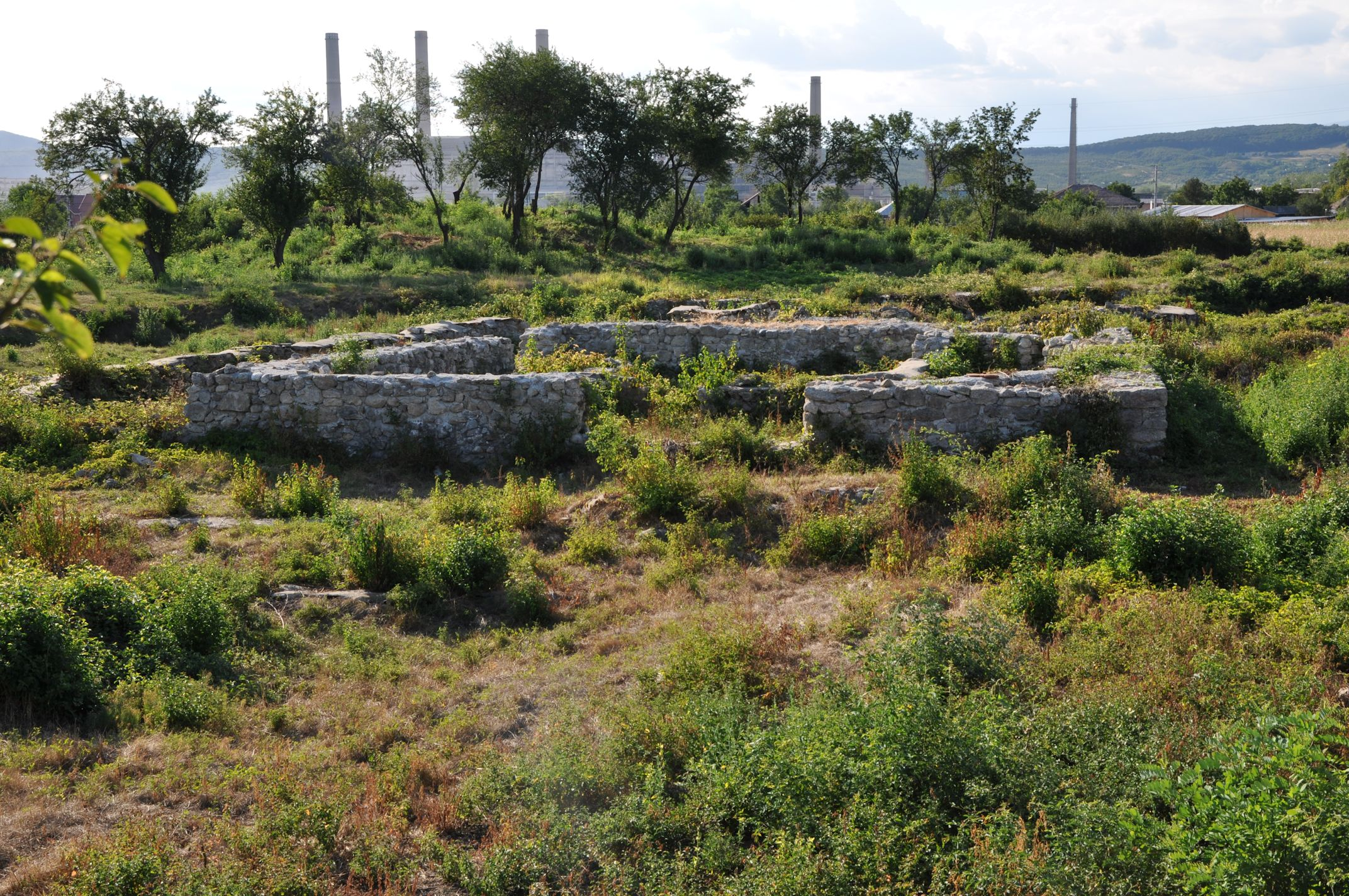

- Location within Romania
- 45.033901°N 24.304256°E
- Location: Stolniceni, Vâlcea, Romania

History
- Founded: c. 103 AD
- Built: Trajan

Site notes
- Elevation: 215 m (705 ft)
- Excavation dates: 1950
- Archaeologists: Dumitru Berciu
- Condition: Ruined

Castra Buridava was a fort in the Roman province of Dacia, part of the frontier system of the Limes Alutanus, and near the Dacian and Roman town of Buridava.

The Romans presence from the end of the Trajan's First Dacian War (102) has been proven. The quarters of the governor of Moesia Inferior were here, with important military units, along with pedites singulares, his personal guard. Troops from the 1st Italica, 5th Macedonica, and 11th Claudia legions participated in the first constructions during Trajan's time, as well as auxiliary units cohort II Flavia Bessorum, cohort IX Batavorum.

Two groups of Roman thermal baths were found. Archaeology in 2022 discovered 13 rooms from the small baths, of which five are apses.

The most recent investigation place the extent of the site at approximately 50 hectares, with most of the significant structures clustered between Olt and the national road. The exact location of the fort is unknown.

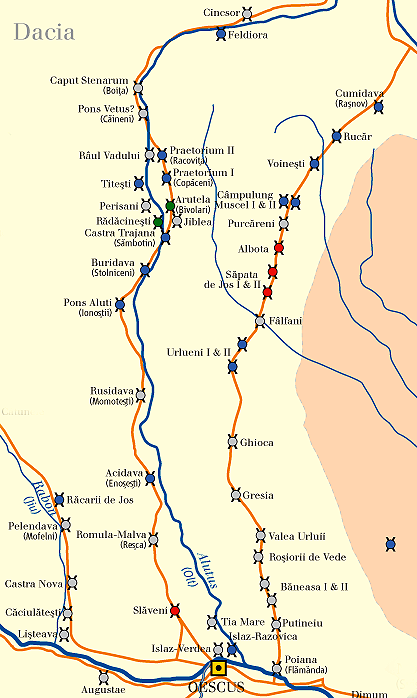
Limes Alutanus (left)

== Gallery ==
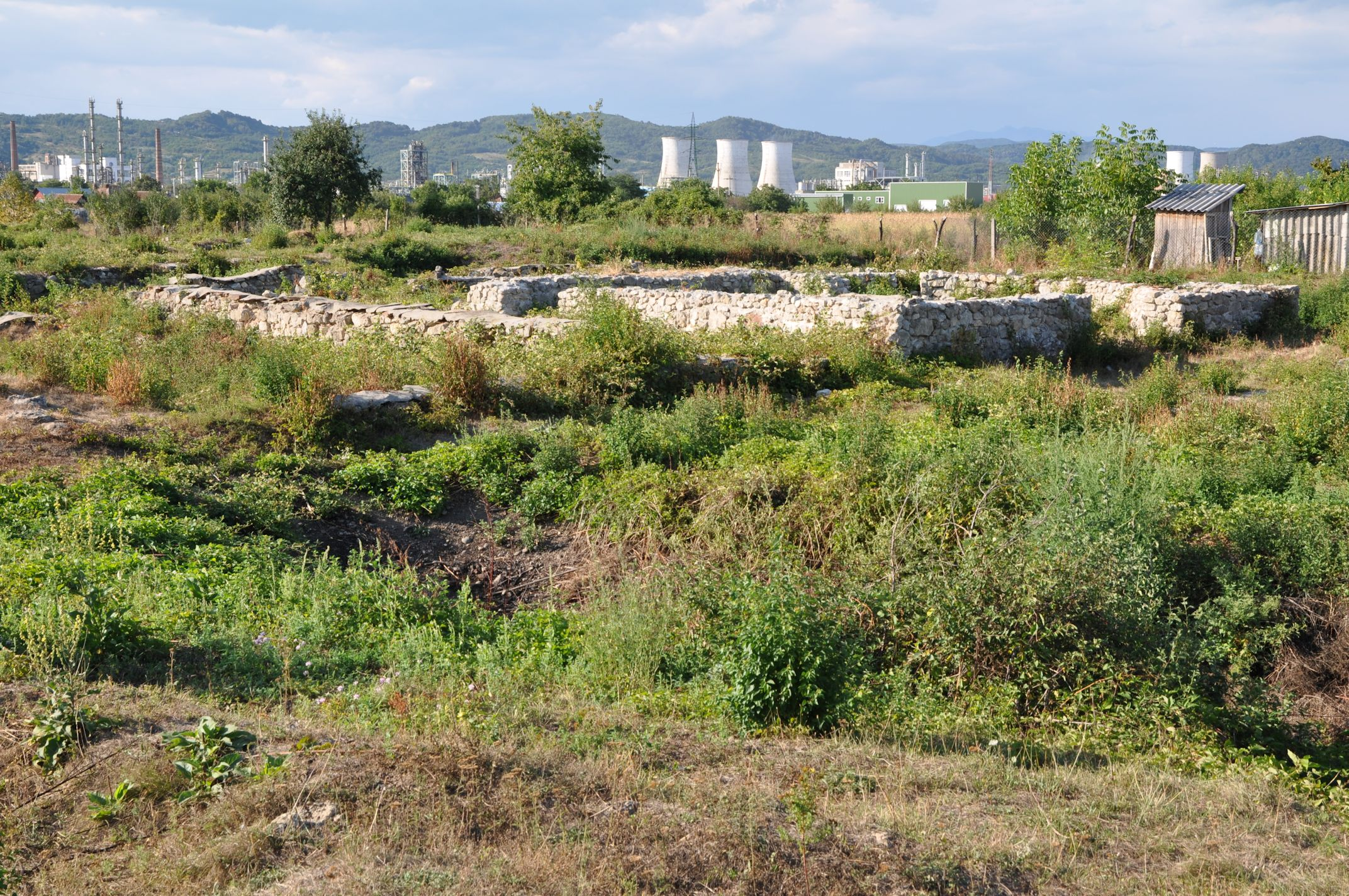

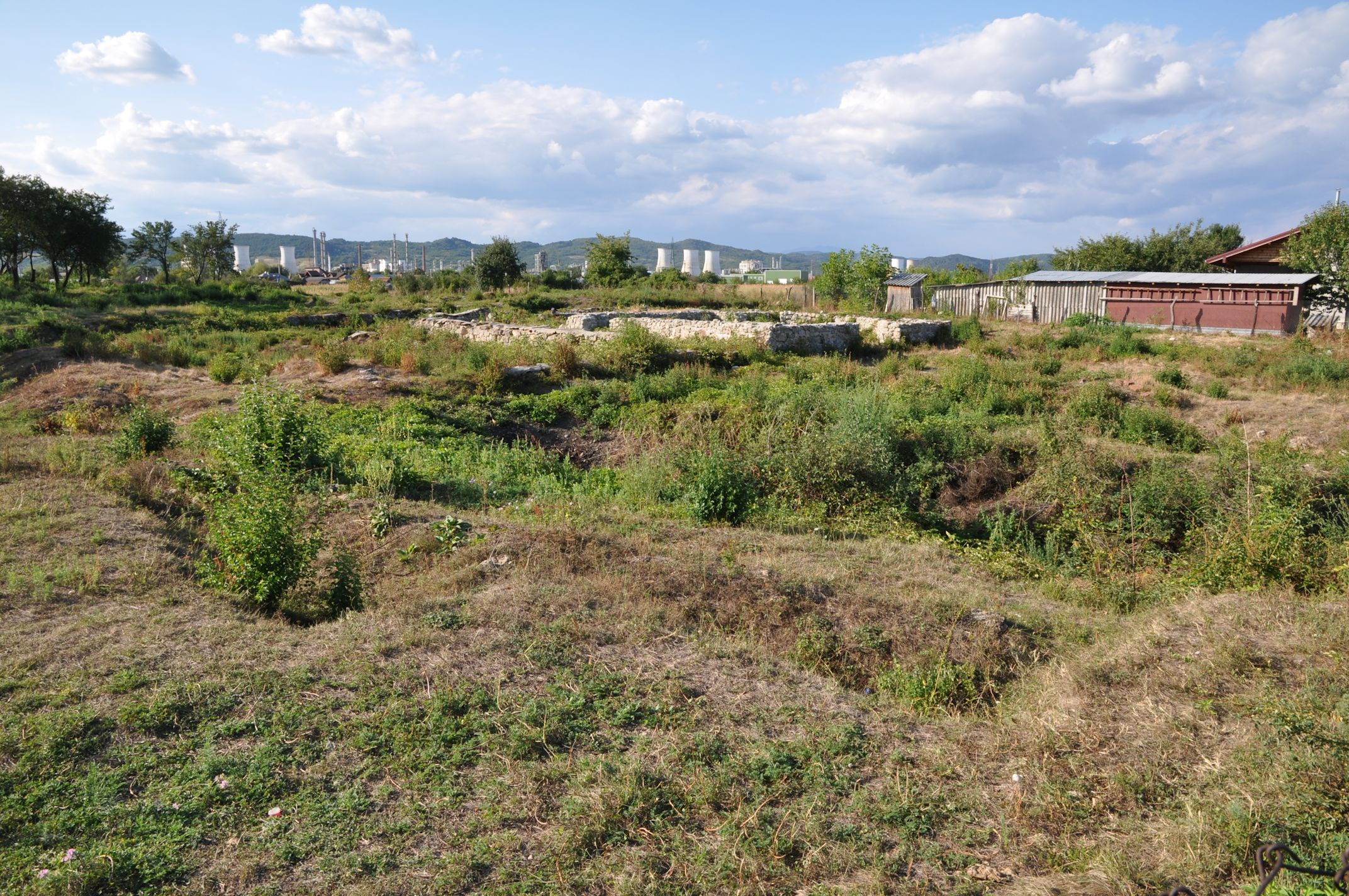

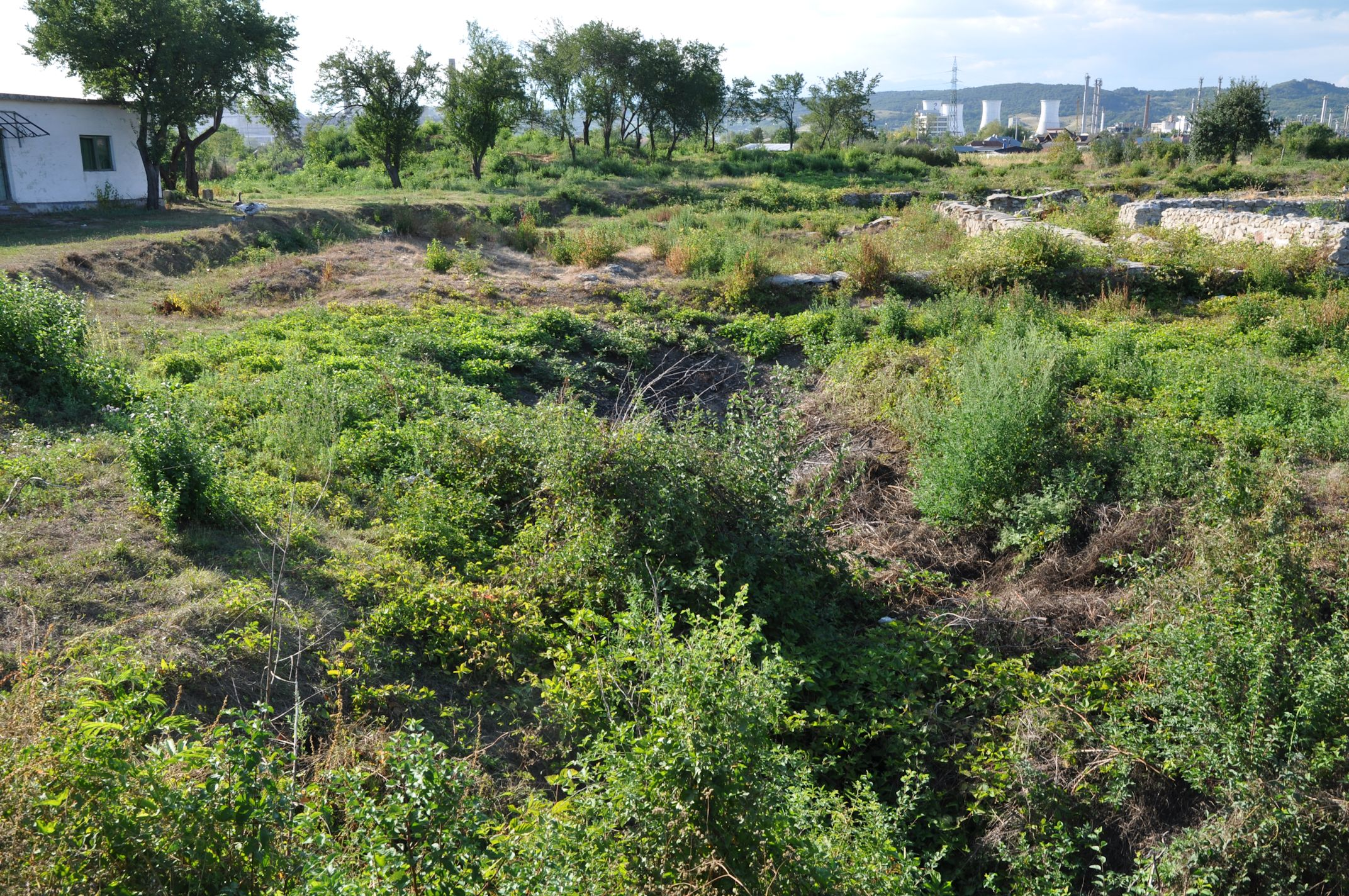

== See also ==
- Buridava
- List of castra in Romania
- List of castra
