= Krobyzoi =

Ancient Thracian, Getic or Dacian tribe in Dobruja

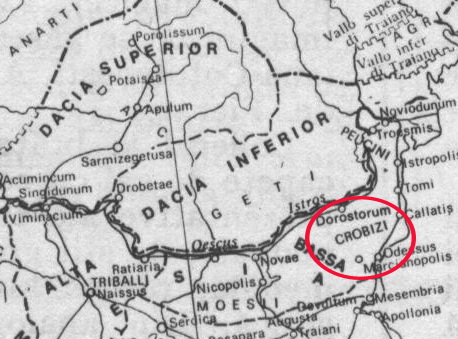
Map location of the Krobyzoi tribe.

Krobyzoi (Greek: "Κρόβυζοι") is a Thracian, Getic or Dacian tribe, which lived in the southern part of the Danube (according to Hecateus), in Dobruja (Scythia Minor) between Tomis and Callatis (according to Strabo) or near Dionysopolis (according to Pseudo-Scymnus). This location makes modern scholars consider them Getae, the main inhabitants of the land between the Carpathian Mountains and the Haemus. V. Besevliev, a renowned Bulgarian linguist, considered that the toponyms ending in dina (Adina, Amlaidina - today probably the locality 23 August in the county of Constanța and Mangalia - and Asbolodina - mentioned in the Callatian territory) can be attributed to the Krobyzoi, which, as can be seen, would coincide with their location by Strabo.

About their history, Philarchus, documenting the period 272 BC-220 BC, says that they had a leader, Isanthes, renowned for his beauty, power and wealth, as well as for the fact that "he surpassed all his people in debauchery" (the testimony is found in the historian Phylarchus and Athenalos). The Byzantine lexicographer Suidas attributed to them the belief in the immortality of the soul, widespread among the Getic peoples.

This location leads modern scholars to consider them Getae, the main inhabitants of the land between the Carpathian Mountains and Haemus.

== See also ==
- List of Dacian tribes
- List of Thracian tribes
- List of ancient cities in Thrace and Dacia
