= Scyrmiadae =

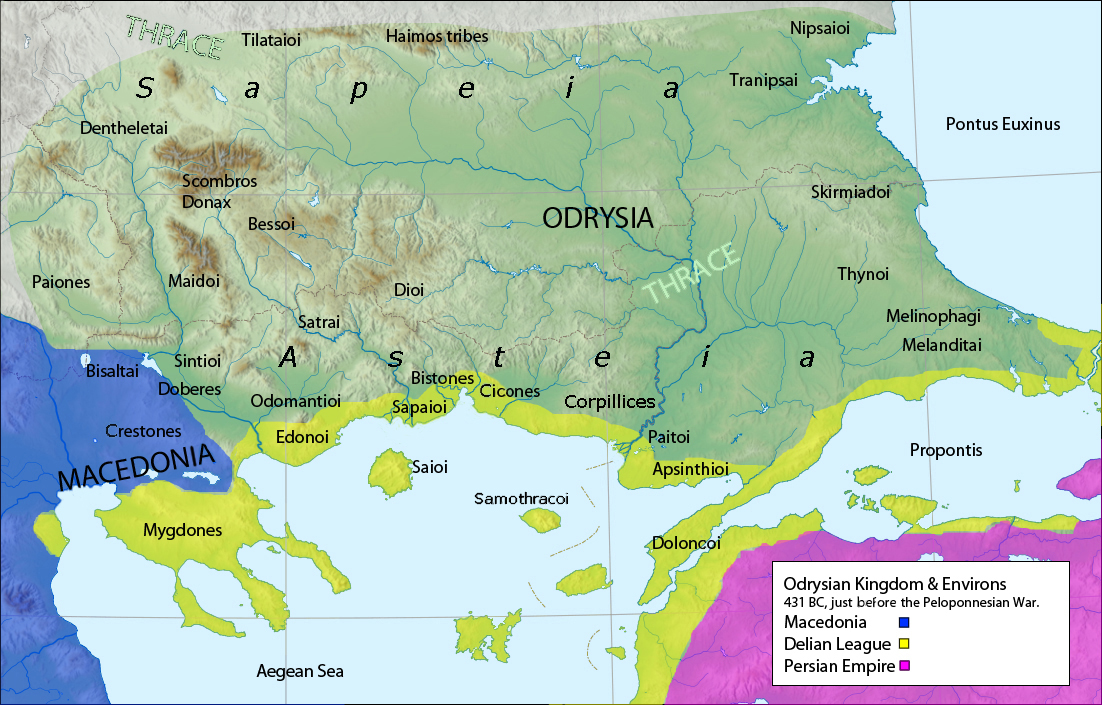
Approximate location of the Scyrmiadae

Scyrmiadae (Greek: Σκυρμιάδαι) is the name of a Thracian tribe. They are mentioned by Herodotus.

== See also ==
- Thracian tribes
