= Paiti =

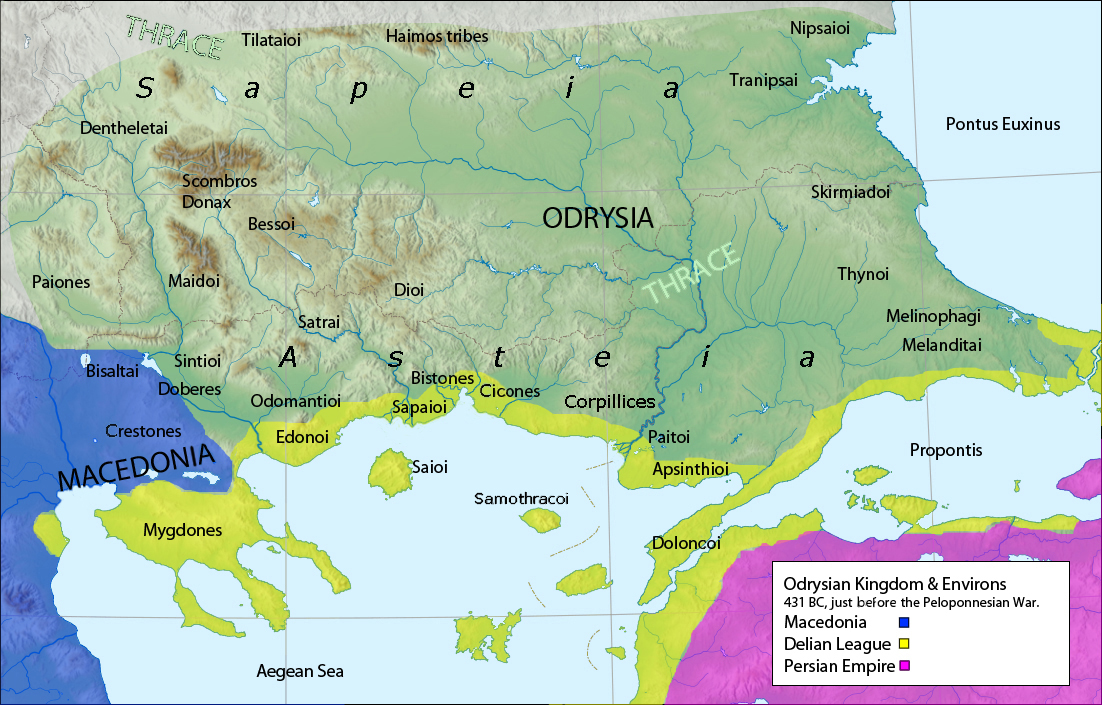
Approximate location of the Paitoi

Paiti (Greek: Παίτοι) is the name of a Thracian tribe.

== See also ==
- Thracian tribes
