= Coelaletae =

Thracian tribe

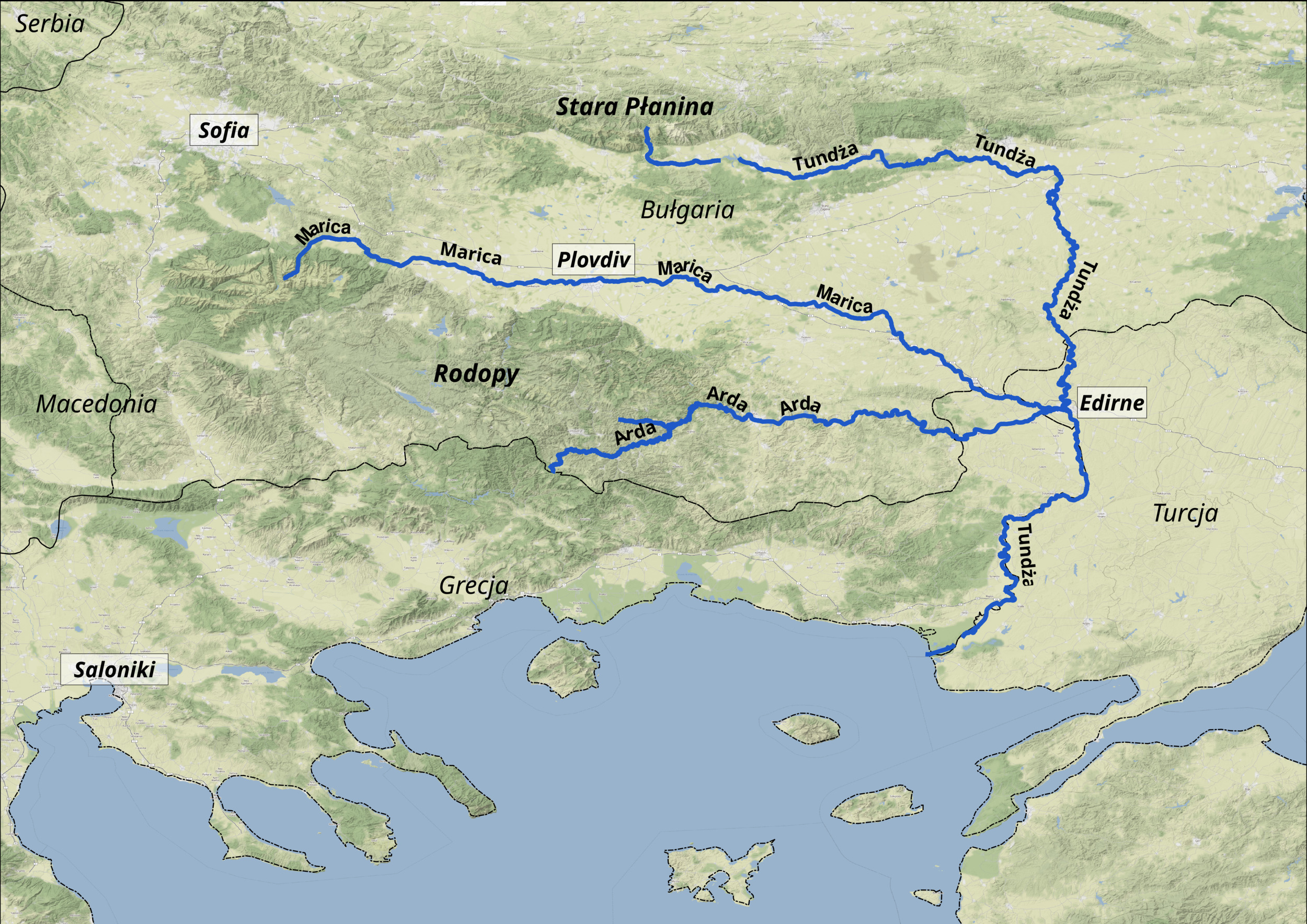
The Coelaletae Maiores inhabited the Balkan Mountains (Stara Planina), while the Coelaletae Minores lived on the north base of mount Rhodope.

Koilaletoi (Greek: Κοιλαλέτοι) or Coilaletae or Coelaletae is the name of a Thracian tribe that lived near the Thracian Odrysae and Dii. Other parts of this tribe were, the Coelaletae Maiores who inhabited the Balkan Mountains and the Coelaletae Minores who lived on the northern foothills of the Rhodope Mountains. They are mentioned by Tacitus.

== See also ==
- List of Thracian tribes
