= Buri tribe =

Historical ethnic group

Map of the Roman Empire under Hadrian (ruled 117–38 AD), showing the location of the Buri in the northern Carpathian Mountains.

The Buri were a Germanic tribe in the time of the Roman Empire who lived in mountainous and forested lands north of the Danube, in an area near what is now the west of modern Slovakia.

The Buri are mentioned in the Germania of Tacitus, where he describes them as being just beyond Marcomanni and Quadi, who lived on the northern bank of the Danube. He describes their language as being like that of the Suebi. In Tacitus, the Buri are not linked to the Lugii.

Ptolemy, however, mentions the Lugi Buri dwelling in what is today southern Poland between the Elbe, the modern Sudetes, and the upper Vistula. This apparently indicates that the Buri were one of several Lugian tribes. Ptolemy distringuishes them from the Silingi Vandals, who are on the upper Oder.

The fate of the Buri was tied to that of their powerful neighbours. They joined the Marcomanni-inspired invasion of the empire in the 2nd century AD, going against the emperor, Marcus Aurelius (Julius Capitolinus, Life of Marcus Aurelius). The latter became a tougher adversary than the Germans had suspected and many tribes, including the Buri, made a separate peace. They were well rewarded by the Romans for doing so, but they then had to face the vengeance of their old allies (Cassius Dio, Books 72–73).

After the death of Marcus, and further Germanic unrest, the Buri petitioned his son, Commodus, for peace. At this point they were destitute, having spent their resources on war. Being destitute and potentially dangerous, they received aid. The Marcomanni were enjoined from seeking retaliation. Since they themselves were now destitute and seeking terms, they complied, as far as we know.

The subsequent history of the Buri is unknown. Very likely, their destiny was like that of the other Germanic peoples along the Danube; that is, they either merged with other tribes in Silesia, or they left their homes to join others in their migrations.

A contingent of the Buri accompanied the Suebi in their invasion of the Iberian Peninsula and established themselves in modern northern Portugal in the 5th century. They settled in the region between the rivers Cávado and Homem, in the area known as Terras de Bouro (Lands of the Buri).

== See also ==
- List of Germanic peoples
- Burs (Dacia)
- Battle of Adamclisi
