= Melanditi =

Ancient Thracian tribe

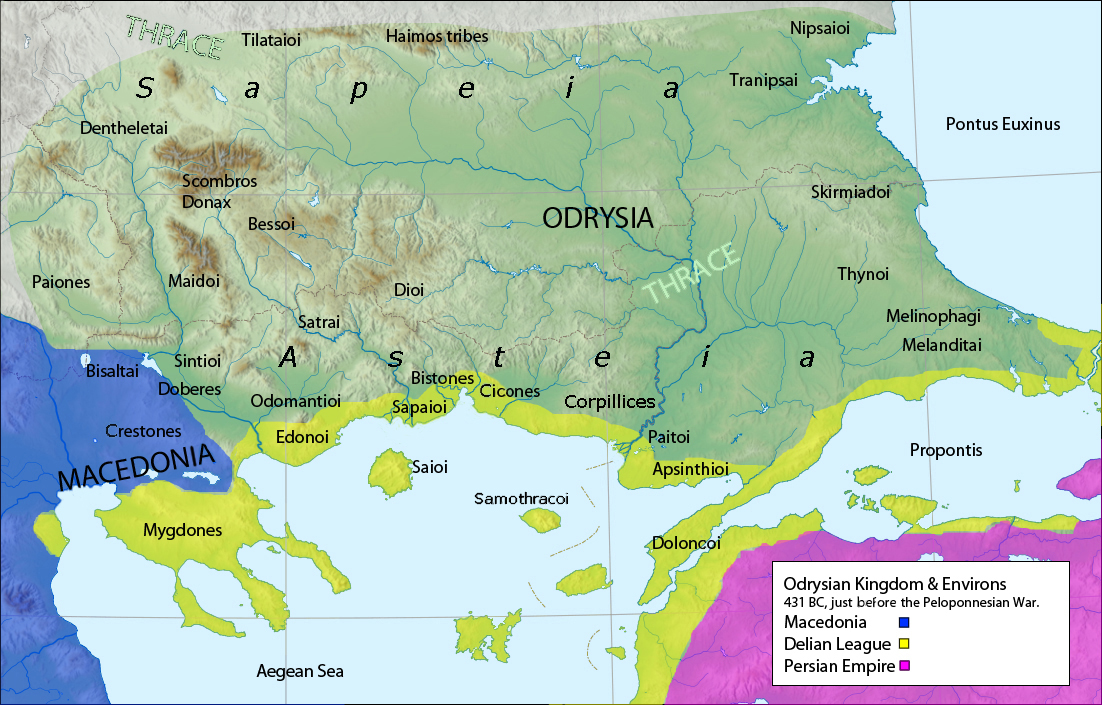
Approximate location of the Melanditai

Melanditae or Melanditai (Greek: Μελανδῖται) is the name of a Thracian tribe that were mentioned in Xenophon's Anabasis.

== See also ==
- Thracian tribes
