= Ocnița, Dâmbovița =

Ocnița
- Commune
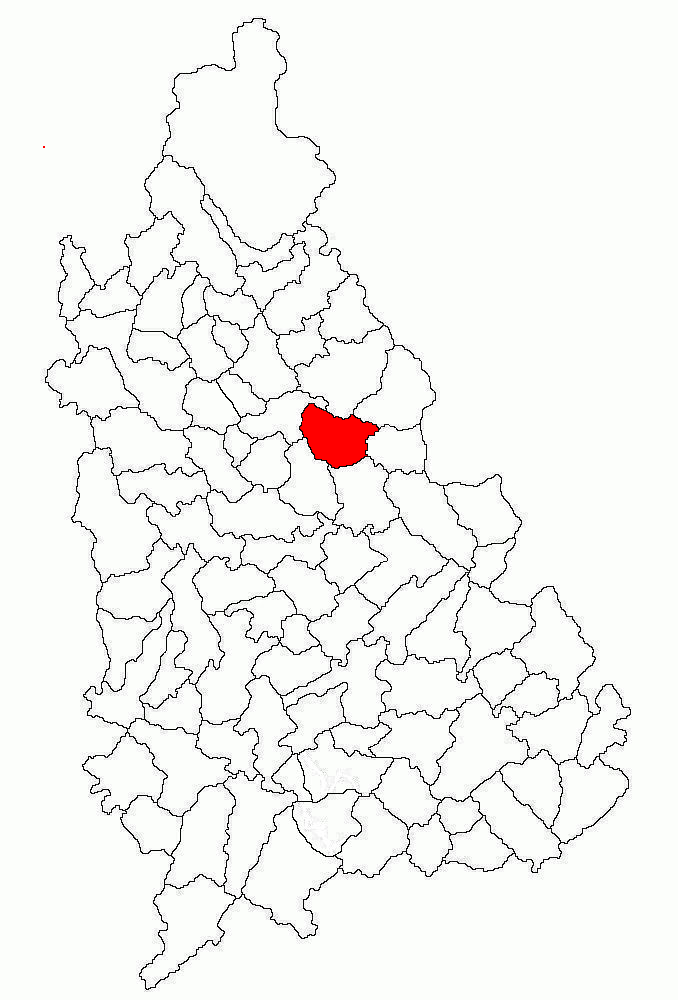
- Location in Dâmbovița County

- Location in Romania
- Coordinates: 44°59′N 25°33′E
- Country: Romania
- County: Dâmbovița

Government
  - Mayor (2024–2028): Eduard Barcău (PSD)
- Area: 41.04 km^{2} (15.85 sq mi)
- Elevation: 288 m (945 ft)
- Population (2021-12-01): 3,950
  - Density: 96/km^{2} (250/sq mi)
- Time zone: EET/EEST (UTC+2/+3)
- Postal code: 137340
- Area code: +(40) 245
- Vehicle reg.: DB
- Website: www.primariaocnita.ro

Ocnița is a commune in Dâmbovița County, Muntenia, Romania with a population of 3,950 people as of 2021. It is composed of a single village, Ocnița.

Historical population
Year	Pop.	±%
2002	4,412	—
2011	4,325	−2.0%
2021	3,950	−8.7%
Source: Census data
