= Buridava =

Dacian town; now located in Stolniceni, Vâlcea, Romania

- Burridava, Burridaua
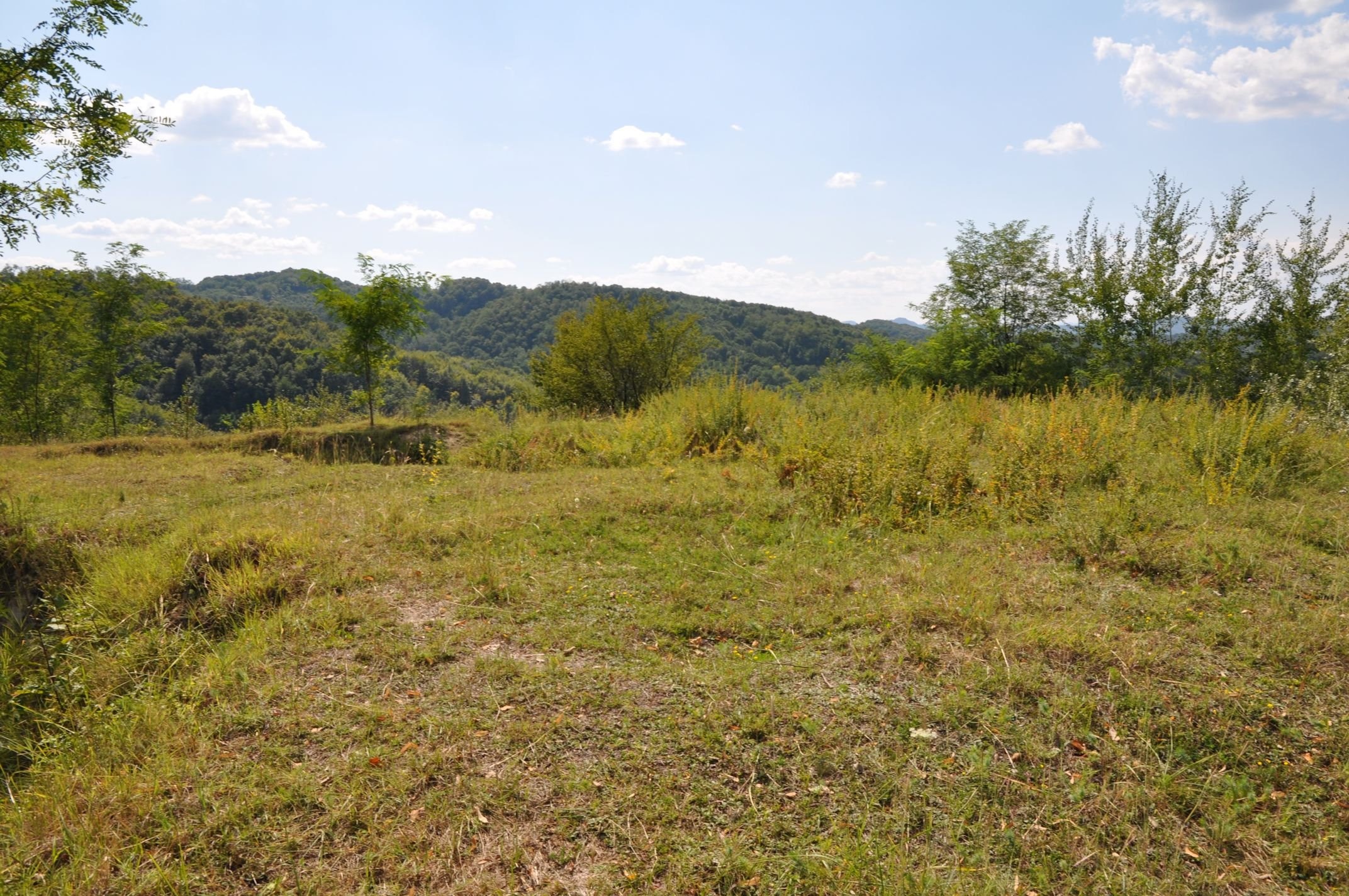
- Top terrace

- Location within Romania
- 45.079352°N 24.287605°E
- Cultures: Buri
- Location: Stolniceni, Vâlcea, Romania

Site notes
- Elevation: 350 m (1,150 ft)
- Archaeologists: Dumitru Berciu
- Condition: Ruined

Monument istoric
- Reference no.: VL-I-s-B-09556

Buridava (Burridava) was a Dacian town situated in Dacia, later Dacia Apulensis, now Romania, on the banks of the river Aluta, now Olt.

Later a Roman fort (Buridava castra) was built there.

== Etymology ==
The name is Geto-Thracian

== History ==
=== Dacian town ===
Buridava was the main economic centre of the Dacian tribe of the Buri. Together with the fortresses at Grădiștea and Tetoiu, it formed part of the defensive system protecting the southeastern approaches to the Dacian royal capital at Sarmizegetusa. The settlement is mentioned by Ptolemy as the home of the Buridavensioi.

=== Roman period ===
The Romans built the Buridava castra at Stolniceni (7 km from Ocnița)

After the Roman conquest, Buridava developed into an important civilian and military centre. It lay approximately halfway between Pons Aluti (Ioneștii Govorii) and Castra Traiana (Sîmbotin) along the Roman road. During the Trajanic Dacian Wars, a detachment of the Cohors I Hispanorum veterana was stationed there, as recorded in "Hunt’s pridianum".

A large stone fort (approximately 50 × 60 m) was built south of the civilian settlement, most likely under Hadrian, and was occupied by units including the Cohors I milliaria Brittonum. Brick and tile stamps confirm the presence of legions from Moesia Inferior (Legio I Italica, Legio V Macedonica, and Legio XI Claudia) as well as auxiliary units such as the Cohors II Flavia Bessorum and Cohors IX Batavorum. The site served as a base during the preparations for Trajan’s second Dacian campaign in 105.

== Archaeology ==
Excavations have revealed both the Dacian settlement and a Roman town measuring roughly 1 km in length and 300 m in width. The Roman structures were built using stone from the Govora-Buleta quarries and paved with terracotta. A large bath complex and the remains of a bronze statue of an emperor were identified but have not been fully excavated.

Pottery finds include both Dacian and Roman types spanning the 1st to the 4th centuries, indicating continuity of occupation by the population under Roman rule. Coins range from the reign of Caligula to Justinian I. A fragment of a vase bearing the inscription BUR has been interpreted as referring to the Buridavenses.

After the Roman withdrawal from Dacia in 271, the settlement continued to exist until the arrival of the Slavs and Avars.

== Gallery ==
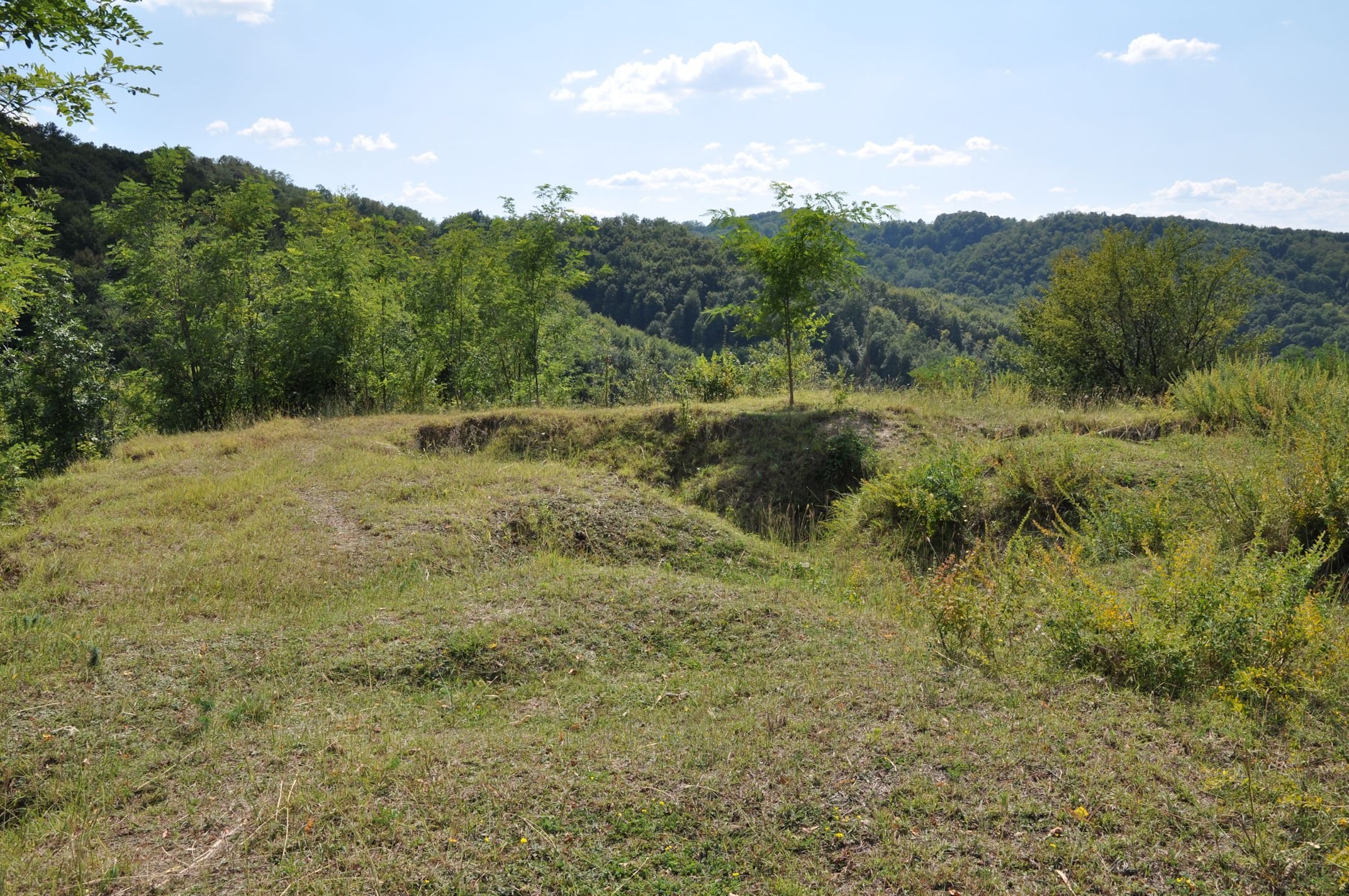

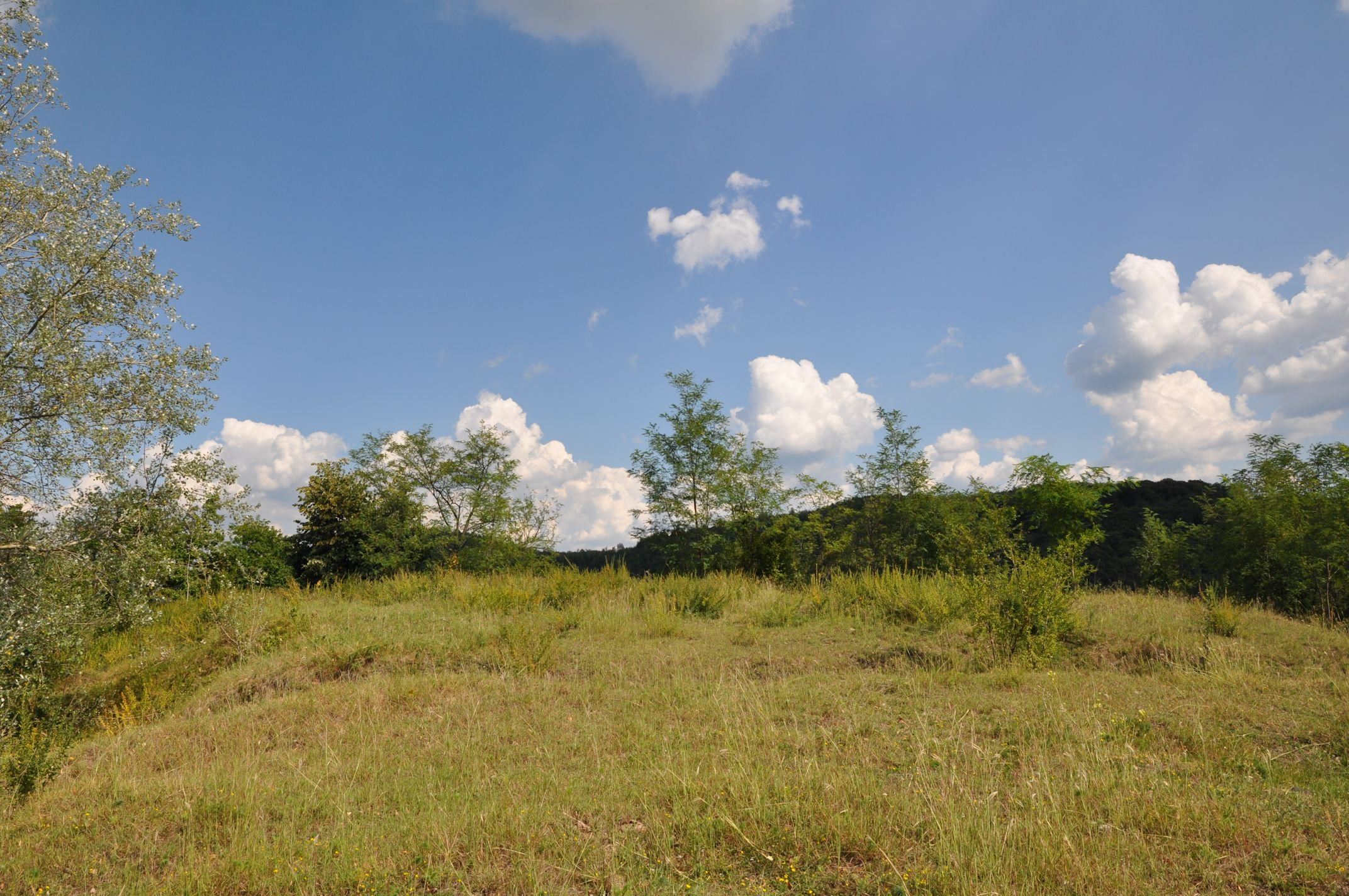

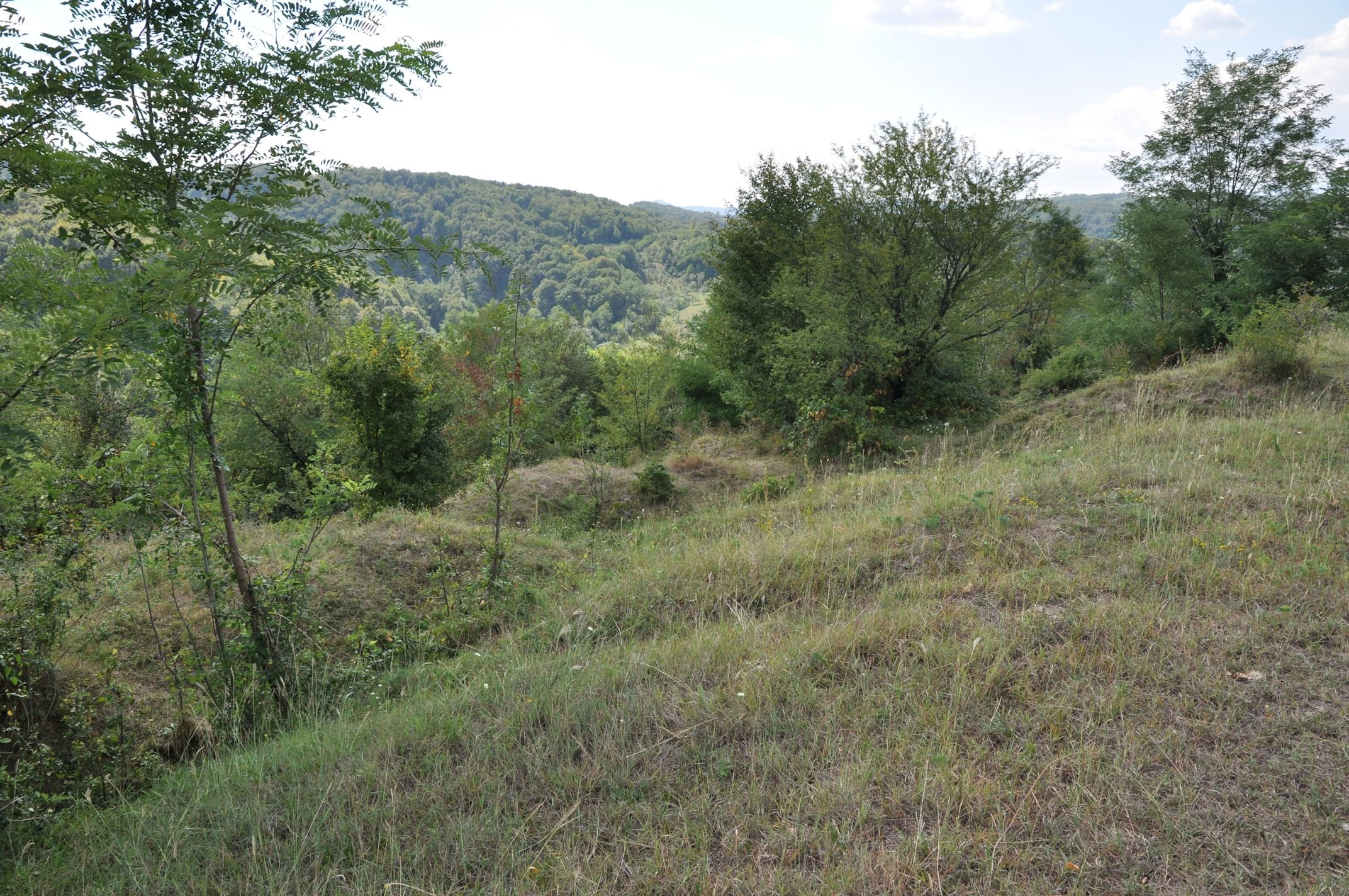

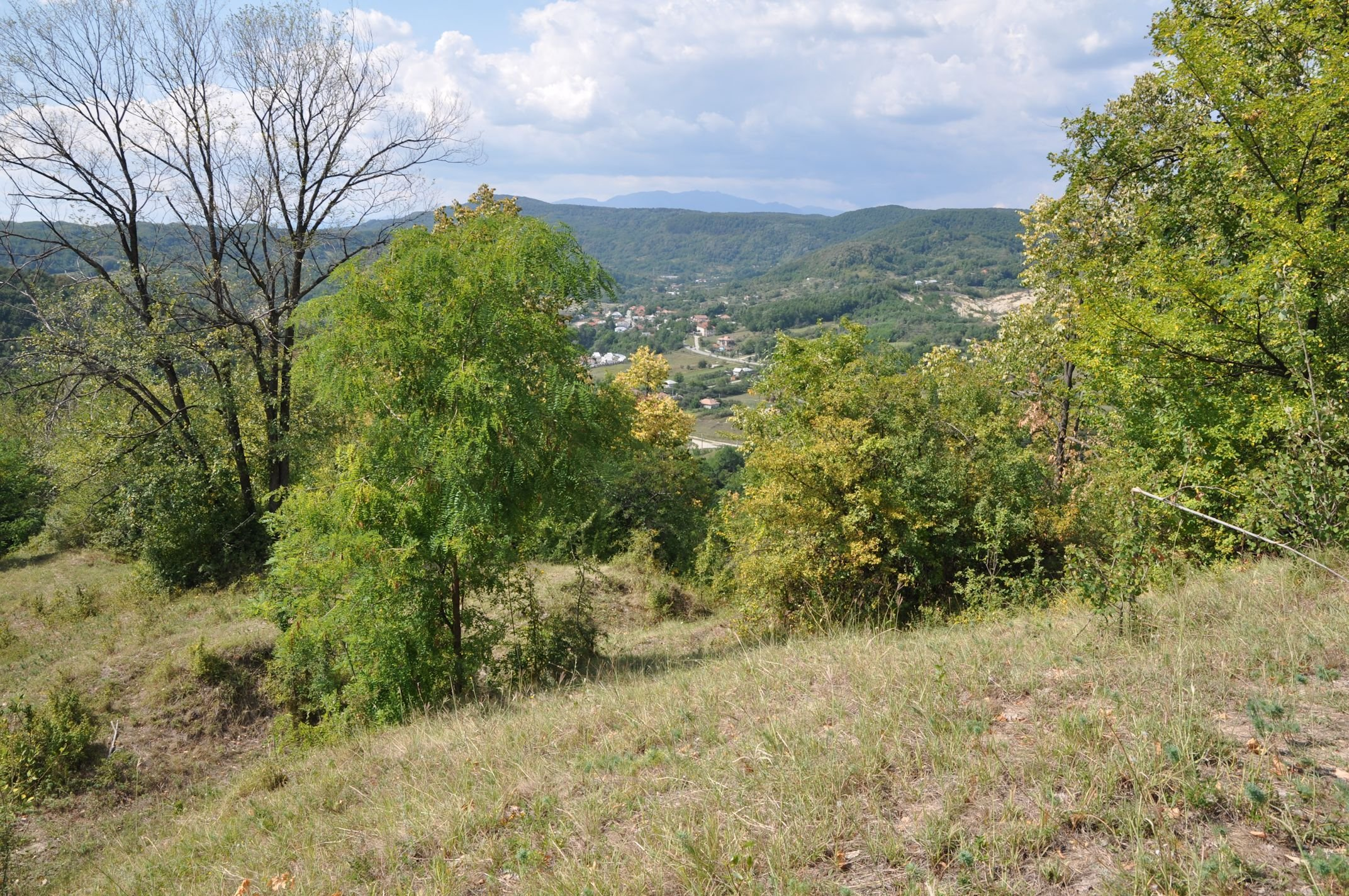

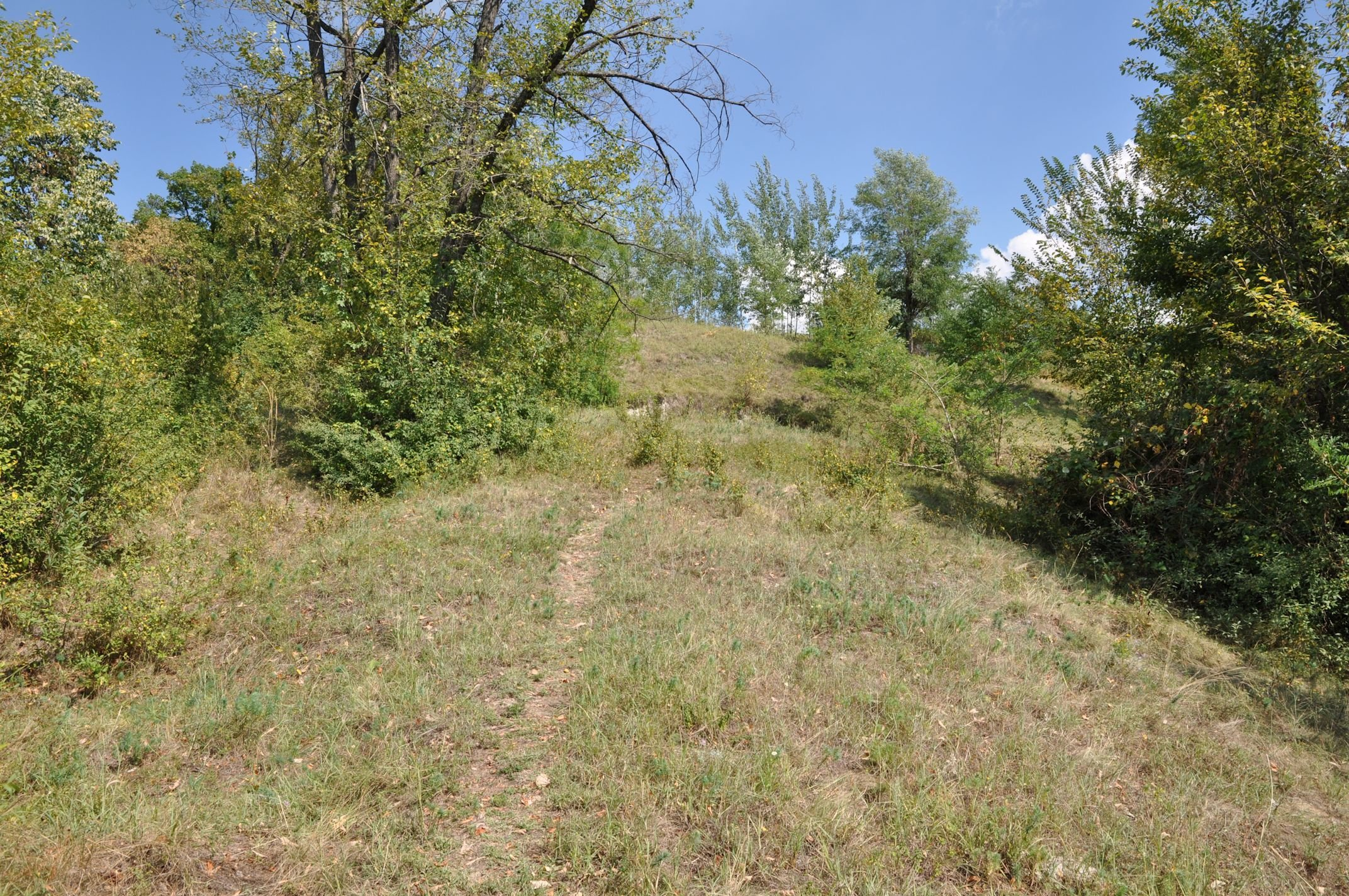

== See also ==
- Burs (Dacia)
- Buridava (castra)
- Dacian davae
- List of ancient cities in Thrace and Dacia
- Dacia
- Roman Dacia

== Sources ==
- Austin, N. J. E.; Rankov, N. B. (1998). Exploratio: Military and Political Intelligence in the Roman World from the Second Punic War to the Battle of Adrianople. Routledge. ISBN 978-0-415-18301-7.
- Berciu, Dumitru (1981). Buridava dacică, Volume 1. Academiei RS Romania.
- Grant, Michael (1986). A Guide to the Ancient World: A Dictionary of Classical Place Names. H. W. Wilson. ISBN 978-0-8242-0742-7.
- MacKenzie, Andrew (1986). Archaeology in Romania: The Mystery of the Roman occupation. Hale. ISBN 978-0-7090-2724-9.
- Oltean, Ioana Adina (2007). Dacia: landscape, colonisation and romanisation. Routledge. ISBN 978-0-415-41252-0.
- Olteanu, Sorin. "Linguae Thraco-Daco-Moesorum - Toponyms Section". Linguae Thraco-Daco-Moesorum (in Romanian and English). Archived from the original on 1 December 2009.
- Stillwell, Richard; MacDonald, William L.; McAllister, Marian Holland (2017). The Princeton Encyclopedia of Classical Sites. Princeton University Press. ISBN 9780691035420.
