= Scaugdae =

Ancient people

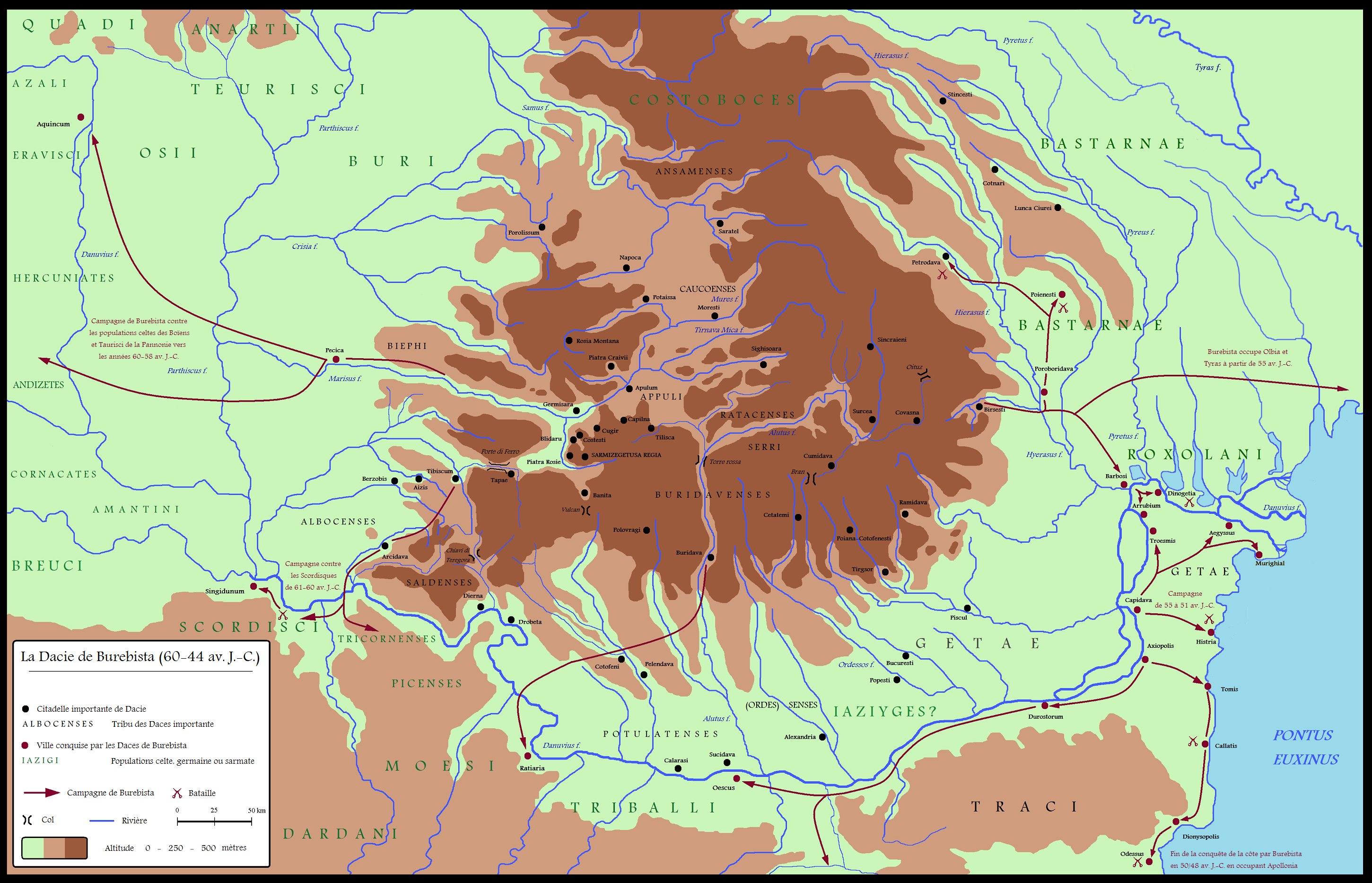
Dacian tribes.

The Scaugdae were an ancient people living between the Haemus Mountains and the Danube river.

== History ==
They are known from only one passage from Pliny the Elder's Naturalis Historia, where he mentions them alongside the Aedi and Clariae as the neighbours of the Getae.

According to the scholar Georgi Mihailov, the Scaugdae were a Getic tribe.

== See also ==
- List of ancient cities in Thrace and Dacia
