= List of kings of Thrace and Dacia =

This article lists kings of Thrace and Dacia, and includes Thracian, Paeonian, Celtic, Dacian, Scythian, Persian or Ancient Greek rulers up to the point of its fall to the Roman Empire, with a few figures from Greek mythology.

== Mythological ==
- Haemus, became a mountain Haemus Mons
- Thrax, son of Ares
- Tegyrios, mortal
- Eumolpus, inherited a kingdom from Tegyrios
- Tereus, the king that was turned into a hoopoe
- Phineus, Phoenician son of Agenor, blind king and seer
- Poltys, son of Poseidon
- Pyreneus, died trying to harm the Muses
- Harpalycus, king of the Amymnaeans
- Thoas, founder of Thoana
- Mopsus, killed Myrine, an amazon queen
- Peirous, a Thracian war leader killed by Thoas the Aetolian
- Rhesus of Thrace, died in the Trojan War
- Cisseus, father of Theano, the wife of Antenor
- Diomedes of Thrace, Giant that ruled over the Bistones
- Lycurgus, of the Edoni
- Oeagrus, father of Orpheus and Linus
- Orpheus of the Cicones
- Polymestor of the Bistonians
- Zalmoxis of the Getae
- Charnabon of the Getae, who came into power when grain was first given to men mentioned by Sophocles
- Pyraechmes of the Paeonians
- Asteropaios of the Paeonians

== Persian ==
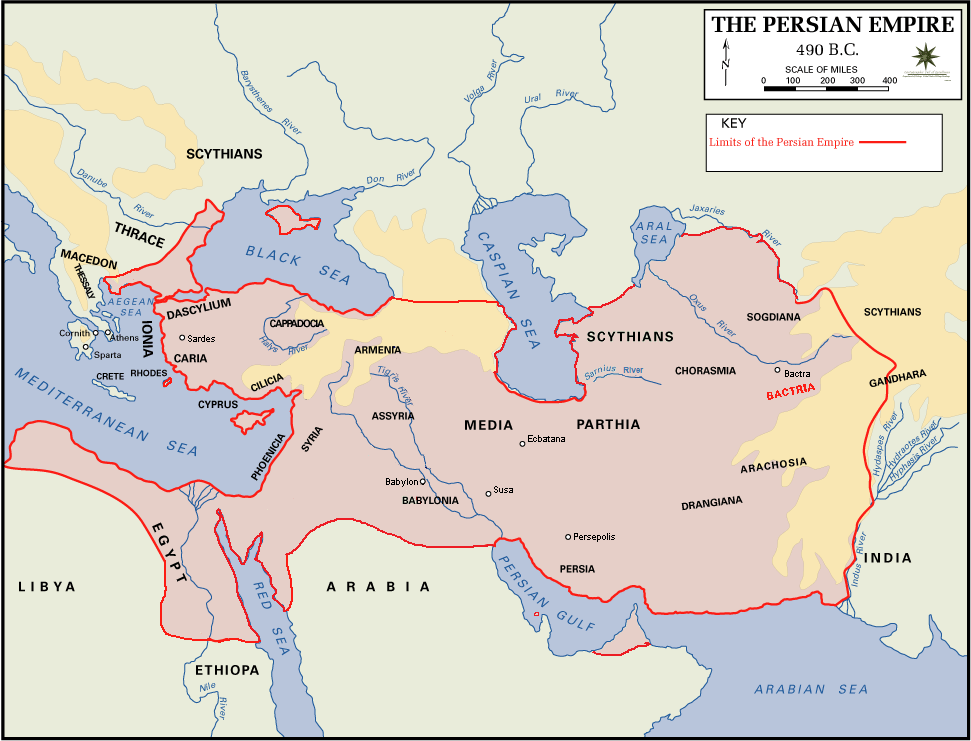
The Persian Empire in 490 BC

- Darius I, Persian Satrapy named Skudra by 516 BC
- Darius I, Thrace is resubjucated by Mardonius at 492 BC
- Xerxes I, retains Thrace from 486 BC to 479 BC

== Tribal kings ==
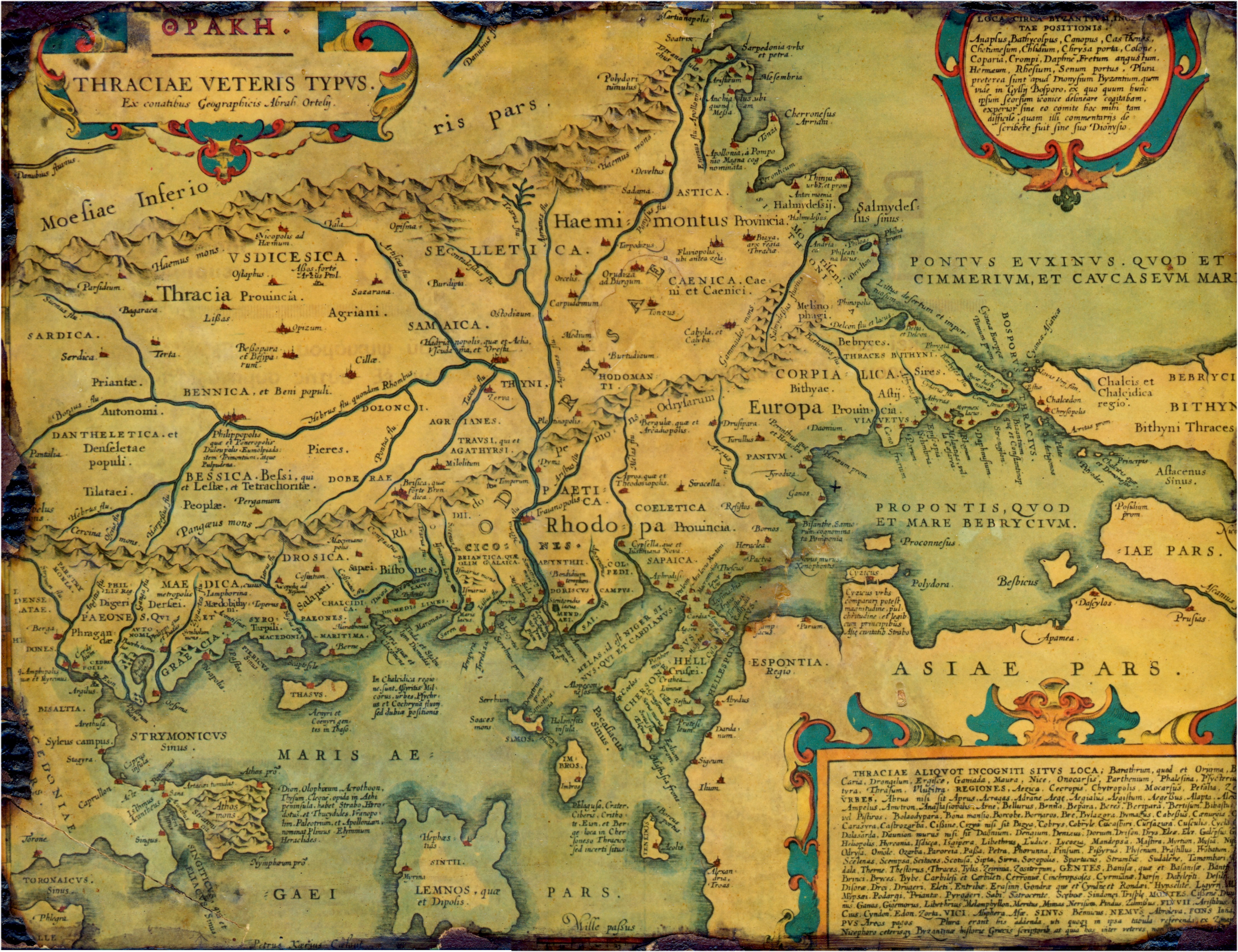
Map of Ancient Thrace made by Abraham Ortelius in 1585

- Olorus, 5th century BC
- Syrmus, king of the Triballi 4th century BC
- Bergaios, petty king of Pangaeum
- Dromichaetes, of the Getae 300 BC
- Langarus, of the Agrianes
- Pleuratus, a Thracian or Illyrian king that attacked Tylis 213–208 BC
- Diegylis, chieftain of the Caeni extremely bloodthirsty 145 BC
- Ziselmius, Diegylis' son
- Mostis, of the Caeni, king ~130–90 BC
- Abrupolis of the Sapaeans, 2nd century BC
- King Blachernai a local Royal thracian of the Odrysian Astaean Family 2nd century BC mentioned by Dionysus of Byzantium.
- Rabocentus of the Bessi mentioned by Cicero
- Cosingas, chieftain and priest of Hera to the tribes of Cebrenii and Sucaeboae
- Getas, king of the Edones

== Getic and Dacian ==
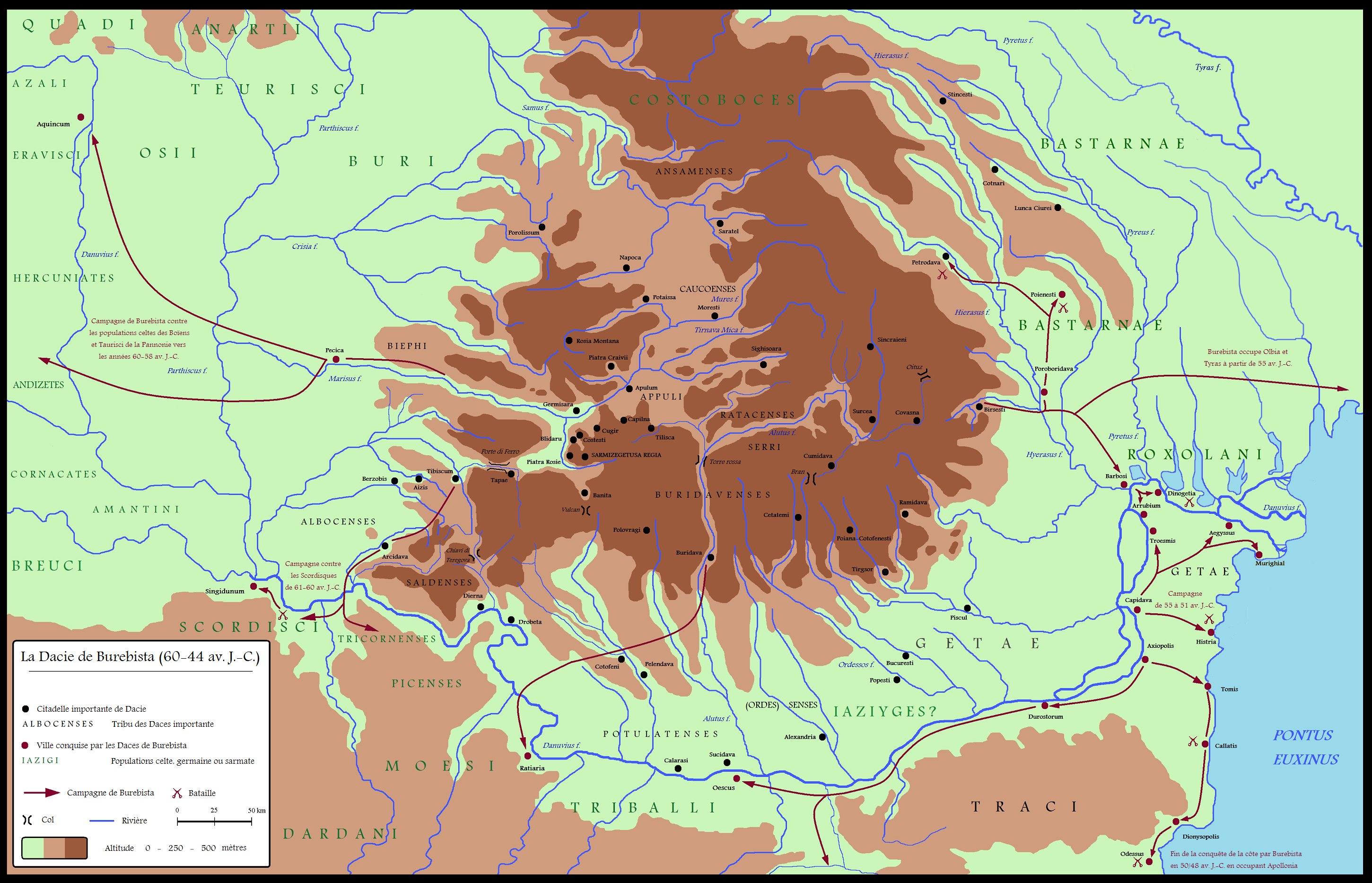
Dacia

- Charnabon, king of the Getae as mentioned by Sophocles in Triptolemus - 5th century BC
- Cothelas, father of Meda of Odessa – 4th century BC
- Rex Histrianorum, ruler in Histria, mentioned by Trogus Pompeius and Justinus - 339 BC
- Dual – 3rd century BC
- Moskon – 3rd century BC
- Dromichaetes – 3rd century BC
- Zalmodegicus – around 200 BC
- Rhemaxos – around 200 BC
- Rubobostes – around 200 BC
- Zoltes – 200 BC
- Oroles – 2nd century BC
- Dicomes – 1st century BC
- Rholes – 1st century BC
- Dapyx – 1st century BC
- Zyraxes – 1st century BC
- Burebista – 82–44 BC
- Deceneus – 44 BC - around 27 BC High Priest
- Thiamarkos - 1st century BC - 1st century AD, Dacian king (inscription "Basileys Thiamarkos epoiei")
- Cotiso – c. 40 BC - c.9 BC
- Comosicus – 9 BC–30 AD
- Scorilo – c.30–70 AD
- Coson
- Duras – c. 69–87
- Decebalus – 87–106
  - 106 AD, Dacia becomes a province of the Roman Empire conquered by Trajan.
- Pieporus, king of Dacian Costoboci – 2nd century AD (inscription)
- Tarbus – 2nd century AD. Dio Cassius mentioned him without specifying his origin. Some authors consider a possible Dacian ethnicity

== Paeonian ==
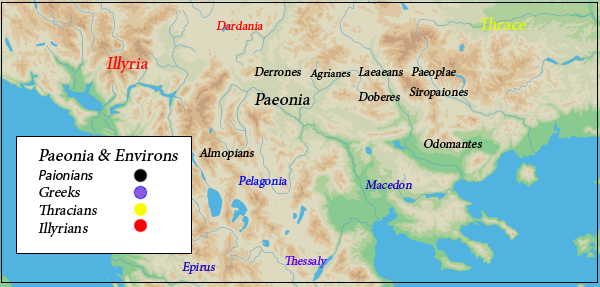
Paeonia, tribes and Environs

- See: List of Paeonian kings

== Celtic rulers in Thrace ==
- Cerethrius
- Critasirus, a Celt
- Bathanatos of the Scordisci

=== Celtic rulers of Tylis in Thrace ===
- Comontorius Celtic military commander, first king of Tylis (c. 277 BC-?)
- Orsoaltius (presumed Celtic on the basis of coin types; order uncertain)
- Cersibaulus (presumed Celtic on the basis of coin types; order uncertain)
- Cavarus, last king of Tylis; overthrown by the Thracians (?-212 BC)

== Greek-Macedonian ==
Map of the territory of Philip II of Macedon

- Philip II of Macedon, annexed Thrace, 341–336 BC
- Alexander the Great retains Thrace and suppresses rebellion, 335–323 BC
- Lysimachus, one of the Diadochi, includes Thrace in his kingdom, 323–281 BC
- Philip V of Macedon controls all cities of Thrace up to the hellespont, 238–179 BC
- Perseus of Macedon continues controlling the part of Thrace his father left him, 212–166 BC

== Odrysian Kingdom ==
The Odrysian Kingdom under Sitalces

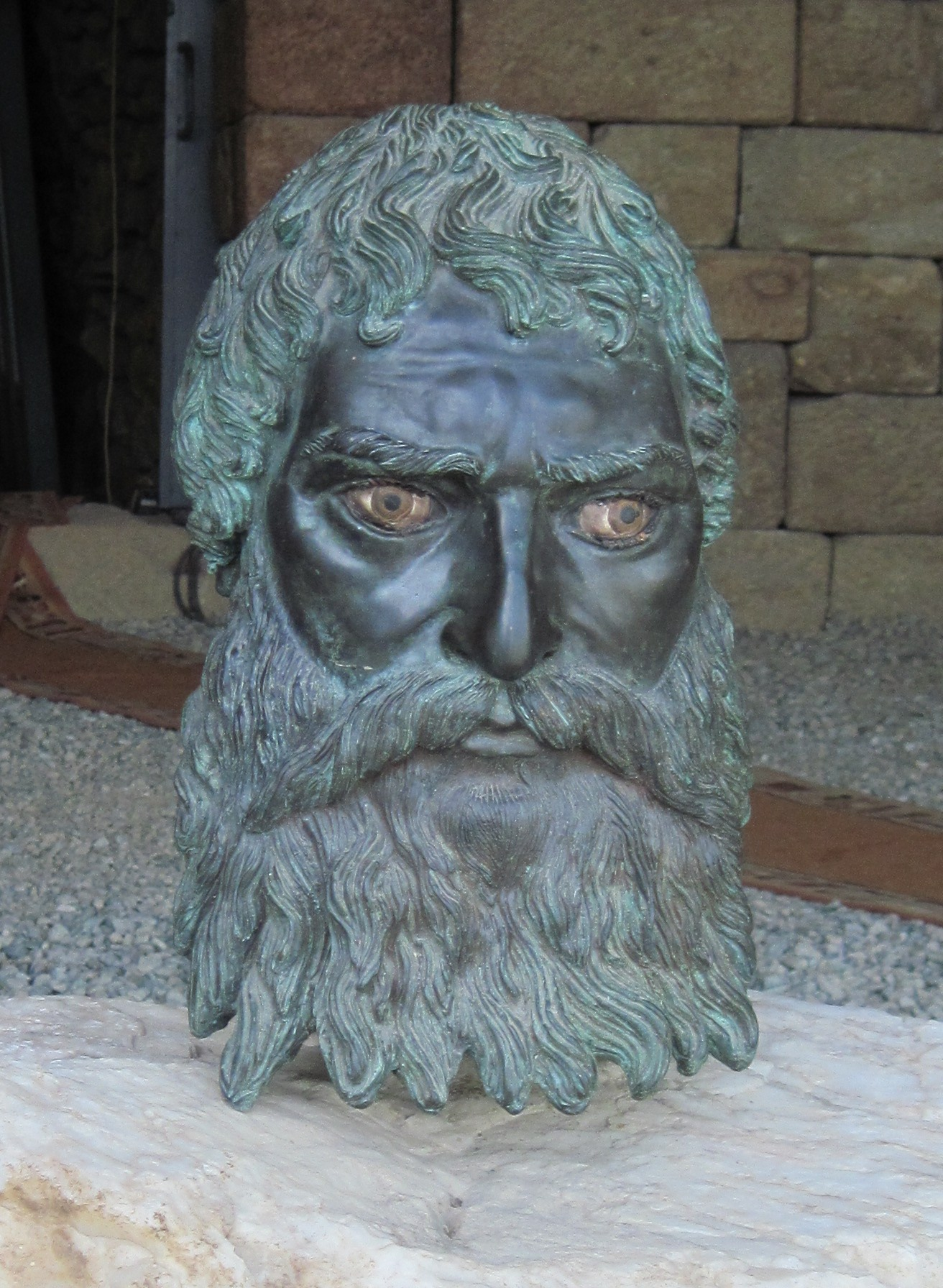
Bronze head of An Odrysian king, most likely Seuthes III

The list below includes the known Odrysian kings of Thrace, but much of it is conjectural, based on incomplete sources, and the varying interpretation of ongoing numismatic and archaeological discoveries. Various other Thracian kings (some of them non-Odrysian) are included as well. Odrysian kings though called Kings of Thrace never exercised sovereignty over all of Thrace. Control varied according to tribal relationships. Odrysian kings (names are presented in Latin forms):

- Teres I, son of ? Odryses, (480/450/430 BC)
- Sparatocus, son of Teres I (c. 465?-by 431 BC)
- Sitalces, son of Teres I (by 431-424 BC)
- Seuthes I, son of Sparatocus (424-396 BC)
- Maesades, father of Seuthes II, local ruler in eastern Thrace?
- Teres II, local ruler in eastern Thrace
- Saratocus (= Sadocus, son of Sitalces?), local ruler in western Thrace?
- Metocus (= Amadocus I?), son of ? Sitalces
- Amadocus I, son of ? Metocus (unless identical to him) or of Sitalces (by 405-after 390 BC)
- Seuthes II, son of Maesades, descendant of Teres I, local ruler in eastern Thrace (by 405?-after 387 BC)
- Hebryzelmis, son or brother of ? Seuthes I (c. 386 BC)
- Cotys I, son of ? Seuthes I or Seuthes II (by 384–360 or 359 BC)
- Cersobleptes, son of Cotys I, king in eastern Thrace (360 or 359-341 BC)
- Berisades, rival of Cersobleptes, king in western Thrace in Strimos (359-352 BC)
- Amadocus II, son of Amadocus I and rival of Cersobleptes, king in central Thrace in Chersonese and Maroneia (359-351 BC)
- Cetriporis, son of Berisades, king in western Thrace in Strimos (358-347 BC)
- Teres III, son of ? Amadocus II, king in central Thrace in Chersonese and Maroneia (351-342 BC)
  - The kings of Thrace are forced to submit to Macedonian rule or overlordship by 341 BC
- Seuthes III, son of ? Teres III or Cotys I, opposed Macedonian rule (by 324–after 312 BC)
  - The succession to Seuthes III is unclear; the area was partitioned among Thracian dynasts and Macedonian kings, after 277 also by the Celts of Tylis

=== Odrysian rulers in eastern Thrace (hypothetical reconstruction) ===
- Cotys II, son of Seuthes (III?) (attested 330 BC, while still prince, if son of Seuthes III?)
- Rhaezdus (Rhoegus?), son of ? Cotys II
- Cotys III, son of Rhaezdus (c. 270 BC)
- Rhescuporis I, son of Cotys III (?-by 212 BC?)

=== Odrysian rulers originally in inner Thrace (hypothetical reconstruction) ===
- Teres IV, son of Seuthes (III?) (c. 295 BC?)
- Seuthes IV, son of Teres (IV?)
- Teres V, son of ? Seuthes IV (c. 255 BC)
- Rhoegus, son of Seuthes (IV?) (mid-Third Century, buried in the Thracian Tomb of Kazanlak)
- Seuthes V, son of ? Rhoegus
- Amadocus III, son of ? Seuthes V (c. 184 BC)
- Cotys IV, son of Seuthes V (by 171-after 166)
- Teres VI, son of ? Amadocus III (c. 148 BC)
- Beithys (Bithys), son of Cotys IV (c.146 BC?)
  - The line may have continued as the Odryso-Astaean dynasty listed below

=== Various Thracian local rulers attested in the Third Century BC ===
- Spartocus, ruler of Cabyle? (c. 295 BC)
- Scostocus, ruler in southern Thrace near Aenus and Sestus (c. 280-after 273 BC)
- Sadalas, ruler near Messembria (c. 275 BC), descendant of Cotys, Medistas, Taruntinus, and Mopsyestis (order and relationships unknown)
- Odoroes (c. 280-273 BC) (?)
- Adaeus, Thracian or Macedonian ruler near Cypsela (c. 260-c. 240 BC)

=== Various non-Odrysian rulers in Thrace ===
- Abrupolis of the Sapaeans, fought with Antigonid Macedonia (by 197-172 BC)
- Autlesbis of the ? Caeni, fought with Cotys IV as Roman ally (c. 168 BC)
- Diegylis of the Caeni (by 150-after 144 BC)
- Zibelmius of the Caeni, son of Diegylis, murdered (c. 141 BC)
- Sothimus of the ? Maedi, ally of Mithradates VI, invaded Roman Macedonia (c. 89 BC)

=== Illyrian rulers ===
- Pleuratus I ruler near Skodra (before c. 250 BC)
- Agron, son of Pleuratus II (c. 250-230 BC)
- Pinnes, son of Agron (230-212 BC); under regency of stepmother Teuta 230-228 BC and of stepfather Demetrius of Pharos 228-219 BC
- Scerdilaidas, son of Pleuratus I (212-206 BC)
- Pleuratus II, son of Scerdilaidas (associated 212, 206-180 BC)
- Gentius (Genthius), son of Pleuratus II (180-168 BC)
  - 168 BC Illyria annexed by the Roman Republic

=== Odryso-Astaean Kingdom ===
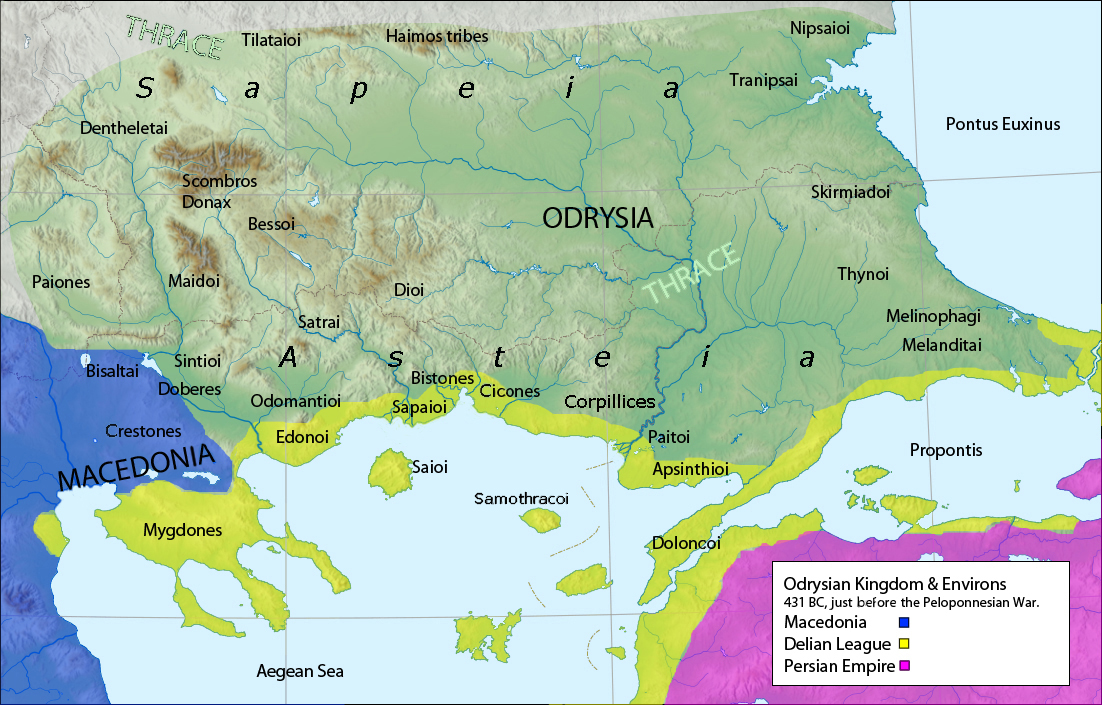
Temporary area of some tribes including Sapei and Astae

A possible continuation of the earlier Odrysian monarchy under a line of kings reigning from Bizye (now Vize) in eastern Thrace.

- Cotys V, son of ? Beithys (?-by 87 BC)
- Sadalas I, son of Cotys V (by 87–after 79 BC)
  - Amadocus, Odrysian royal sent to the aid of Sulla at Chaeronea in 86 BC
- Cotys VI, son of Sadalas I (by 57–48 BC)
- Sadalas II, son of Cotys VI (48–42 BC)
- Sadalas III, kinsman of Sadalas II (42-31 BC)
- Cotys VII, son of Sadalas II by Polemocratia (31–18 BC)
- Rhescuporis II (Astaean), son of Cotys VII by daughter of the Sapaean king Cotys II, killed by the Bessi (18–11 BC)
  - 11 BC Astaean Thrace conferred on Rhescuporis II's maternal uncle, the Sapaean king Rhoemetalces I, by the Roman emperor Augustus, thereby uniting Thrace

=== Sapaean Kingdom and unified Thrace ===
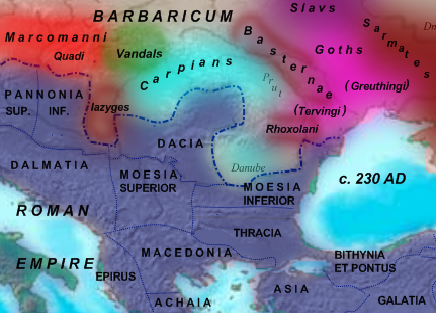
Roman provinces in the Eastern Balkans

Originally a local power in the Rhodope area of southern Thrace, the Sapaean kings increased in power and influence and, with Roman blessing, found themselves masters of a unified kingdom of Thrace from 11 BC until the Roman annexation in AD 46.

- Cotys I, son of ? Rhoemetalces, 57?–by 48 BC
- Rhescuporis I, son of Cotys I, by 48 BC–41 BC
  - Rhascus, son of Cotys I, associate ruler? c. 42 BC
- Cotys II, son of Rhescuporis I, 42 BC–31 BC
  - Thrace becomes a unitary client state of Rome in 11 BC
- Rhoemetalces I, son of Cotys II, 31 BC–AD 12 (monarch of all Thrace from 11 BC)
- Rhescuporis II, son of Cotys II, in western Thrace, deposed by the Roman emperor Tiberius I, 12–19
- Cotys III, son of Rhoemetalces I, in eastern Thrace, killed by his uncle Rhescuporis II, 12–19; married Antonia Tryphaena
- Rhoemetalces II, son of Cotys III and Antonia Tryphaena, 19-38
- Antonia Tryphaena (Queen), co-ruler of her son Rhoemetalces II
- The last client rulers of Thrace: Pythodoris II (Queen) and Rhoemetalces III; Rhoemetalces III, son of Rhescuporis II, 38-46; married his cousin's daughter Pythodoris II (daughter of Cotys III and Antonia Tryphaena), murdered by wife
  - 46 annexation by the Roman Empire, by the Roman emperor Claudius I

== Scythian ==
- Spargapeithes, king of the Agathyrsi

== See also ==
- Odrysian kingdom
- Sapaeans
- Paeonia
- List of ancient cities in Thrace
- List of ancient tribes in Thrace
- List of rulers of Illyria
- List of ancient cities in Illyria
- List of ancient tribes in Illyria
