= 350s BC =

Decade

This article concerns the period 359 BC – 350 BC.

== Events ==
=== 359 BC ===
==== By place ====
====== Macedonia ======
- The Macedonian King Perdiccas III is killed while defending his country against an Illyrian attack led by King Bardylis. He is succeeded by his infant son, Amyntas IV. The child's uncle, Philip II, assumes the regency.
- The Illyrians prepare to close in, the Paeonians raid from the north and two claimants to the Macedonian throne are supported by foreign powers. Philip II buys off his dangerous neighbours and, with a treaty, cedes Amphipolis to Athens.

=== 358 BC ===
==== By place ====
====== Persian Empire ======
- Artaxerxes III ("Ochus") succeeds Artaxerxes II as King of Persia and restores central authority over the Persian empire's satraps. To secure his throne he puts to death most of his relatives.

====== Greece ======
- Alexander of Pherae, Despot of Pherae in Thessaly is murdered by his wife's brother at her instigation.
- Cersobleptes, in conjunction with his brothers, Amadocus II and Berisades, inherits the dominions of the Thracian king, Cotys I, following his murder. However, the overall management of Thracian affairs is assumed by the Euboean adventurer, Charidemus, who is connected by marriage with the royal family, and who plays the prominent part in the ensuing negotiations with Athens for the possession of the Thracian Chersonese.

====== Macedonia ======
- Philip II of Macedonia invades the hill tribes of Paeonia and decisively beats them.

====== Roman Republic ======
- The Romans defeat the Volsci, annex most of their territory, and settle it with Roman colonists. The Romans also force the Latin League to renew its close alliance with Rome, an alliance which was weakened by Rome’s defeat at the hands of the Gauls in 390 BC.

=== 357 BC ===
==== By place ====
====== Persian Empire ======
- Rhodes falls to the Persian satrap Mausolus of Halicarnassus.

See Purim

====== Thrace ======
- Euboean mercenary Charidemus recaptures the Thracian Chersonese for Athens. He receives, from Athens, a golden crown for his part in the victory.

====== Macedonia ======
- The Macedonian general, Parmenion, wins a great victory over the Illyrians. King Philip II of Macedon, having disposed of an Illyrian threat, occupies the Athenian city of Amphipolis (which commands the gold mines of Mount Pangaion). Philip II now has control of the strategic city which secures the eastern frontier of Macedonia and gives him access into Thrace.
- Philip II of Macedon marries Olympias, the Molossian princess of Epirus thus helping to stabilize Macedonia's western frontier.

====== Sicily ======
- The brother-in-law of Dionysius I, Dion, exiled from Syracuse in 366 BC by Dionysius II, assembles a force of 1,500 mercenaries at Zacynthus and sails to Sicily. Dion wrests power from the weak Dionysius II, who is exiled and flees to Locri.

=== 356 BC ===
==== By place ====
====== Persian Empire ======
- Having blamed their defeats to Philip II in Thessaly and Chalcidice on his colleagues (Iphicrates and Timotheus), Chares is left in sole command of the Athenian fleet. Chares, in need of money for his war effort, frowns upon asking it from Athens, so, partly compelled by his mercenaries, he enters the service of the insurgent Achaemenid satrap of Phrygia Artabazus who rewards Chares very generously.
- Artabazus is also supported by the Thebans, who send him 5,000 men under one of their generals Pammenes. With the assistance of these and other allies, Artabazus defeats his Achaemenid enemies in two great battles.
- The Achaemenid King Artaxerxes III orders all the satraps (governors) of his empire to dismiss their mercenaries. The Athenians, who have originally approved their mercenaries' collaboration with Artabazus of Phrygia, order them to leave due to their fear of Achaemenid support for the rebellion of Chios, Rhodes, and Cos. Thebes follows suit and withdraws its mercenaries.
- With King Artaxerxes III succeeding in depriving Artabazus of his Athenian and Theban allies, Artabazus is defeated by the Persian King's general, Autophradates.

====== Greece ======
- Philip II of Macedon secretly offers the city of Amphipolis back to the Athenians in exchange for the valuable port of Pydna. Despite the Athenians being willing to comply, both Pydna and Potidaea are conquered by the Macedonians (along with other Athenian strongholds in Thessaly and Chalcidice) despite being defended by Athenian forces led by general and mercenary commander, Chares, as well as generals Iphicrates and Timotheus.
- With Pydna and Potidaea occupied, Philip II decides to keep Amphipolis anyway. He also takes the city of Crenides from the Odrysae and renames it Philippi.
- The Phocians capture and sack Delphi in whose territory the famous temple and oracle stand. A sacred war is declared against them by the other members of the Great Amphictyonic League. The Phocians, led by two capable generals, Philomelus and Onomarchus, use Delphi's riches to hire a mercenary army to carry the war into Boeotia and Thessaly.
- The Social War begins between the Second Athenian League, led by Athens, and its revolting allies of Chios, Rhodes, and Kos as well as the independent state Byzantium. Mausolus, the tyrant of Caria, instigates the rebellion against the Athenian control of these states. The revolting allies ravage the islands of Lemnos and Imbros which are loyal to Athens.
- The Athenian generals Chares and Chabrias are given command of the Athenian fleet with the aim of defeating the rebellious cities. However, Chabrias' fleet is defeated and he is killed in its attack on the island of Chios, off the coast of Ionia.
- Chares is given sole command of the Athenian fleet and withdraws to the Hellespont to move against Byzantium. The generals Timotheus, Iphicrates and his son Menestheus are sent with 60 ships to help him when the enemy fleet is sighted on the Hellespont. Timotheus and Iphicrates refuse to engage due to a severe gale, but Chares does engage and lose many of his ships. Timotheus and Iphicrates are accused by Chares and put on trial, however only Timotheus is condemned to pay a fine.

====== Roman Republic ======
- Gaius Marcius Rutilus is the first plebeian to be chosen as a dictator in Rome.

====== China ======
- With his reforms initiated in this year, the Chinese prime minister Shang Yang starts to transform the once marginal and frontier State of Qin to become the most dominant military force amongst the Warring States of China by the 3rd century BC.

==== By topic ====
====== Architecture ======
- July 21 (traditional date) – The Temple of Artemis at Ephesus is burned down by a madman named Herostratus, destroying one of the Seven Wonders of the World. The great temple was built by Croesus, king of Lydia, in about 550 BC and was famous not only for its great size (110 metres by 55 metres), but also for the magnificent works of art that adorned it.

=== 355 BC ===
==== By place ====
====== Greece ======
- King Artaxerxes III of Persia forces Athens to conclude a peace which requires the city to leave Asia Minor and to acknowledge the independence of its rebellious allies.
- King Archidamus III of Sparta supports Phocis against Thebes in the "Sacred War".
- Chares' war party in Athens is replaced by one under Eubulus which favours peace. Eubulus restores the economic position of Athens without increasing the burden of taxation and improves the Athenian fleet while its docks and fortifications are repaired.

=== 354 BC ===
==== By place ====
====== Greece ======
- Reflecting the growing level of discontent with his tyrannical conduct, Dion is assassinated by Callippus, an Athenian who has accompanied him on his expedition to take over as tyrant of Syracuse. Dionysius II remains in exile in Italy.
- Athens recognises the independence of Chios, Kos and Rhodes and makes peace with Mausolus of Caria.
- The Phocians suffer a defeat in the Sacred War against Athens.
- Philip II of Macedon takes and destroys Methone, a town which has belonged to Athens. During the siege of Methone, Philip loses an eye.

====== Roman Republic ======
- Rome allies itself with the Samnites and they agree on a mutual defence pact.
- Rome defeats the Etruscans of the city of Caere.

====== China ======
- The State of Qi is victorious over the State of Wei in the Battle of Guiling, a conflict which involves the military strategy of Sun Bin.

==== By topic ====
====== Architecture ======
- The Mausoleum at Halicarnassus in Caria, the tomb of King Mausolus and one of the Seven Wonders of the World, is built.

=== 353 BC ===
==== By place ====
====== Persian Empire ======
- Mausolus, King and Persian satrap of Caria, dies and is succeeded in 352 BC by Artemisia, his sister and wife.

====== Greece ======
- The Phocians threaten Thessaly to their north. Philip II of Macedon saw his opportunity to penetrate south.
- Clearchus, the tyrant of Heraclea, a Greek city on the Black Sea, is murdered by some of the city's citizens led by Chion after a reign of twelve years. Most of the conspirators are killed by the tyrant's body-guards upon the spot, while others are captured and put to death. Within a short time, the city falls under the rule of the new tyrant Satyrus, Clearchus' brother.

=== 352 BC ===
==== By place ====
====== Greece ======
- After two initial efforts, Philip II of Macedon drives the Phocians south after a major victory over them in the Battle of Crocus Field. Athens and Sparta come to the assistance of the Phocians and Philip is checked at Thermopylae. Philip does not attempt to advance into central Greece with the Athenians occupying this pass. With this victory, Philip accrues great glory as the righteous avenger of Apollo, since the Phocian general Onomarchos has plundered the sacred treasury of Delphi to pay his mercenaries. Onomarchos' body is crucified, and the prisoners are drowned as ritual demanded for temple-robbers.
- Philip then moves against Thrace. He makes a successful expedition into Thrace, gaining a firm ascendancy in the country, and brings away a son of Cersobleptes, the King of Thrace, as a hostage. Philip II's Thessalian victory earns him election as president (archon) of the Thessalian League.

====== Rome ======
- Consuls: Publio Valerio Publicola & Gaius Marcius Rutilus
- Dictator: Gaius Julius Iulus

=== 351 BC ===
==== By place ====
====== Persian Empire ======
- Encouraged by a failed effort at invasion of Egypt by King Artaxerxes III, Phoenicia and Cyprus revolt against Persia.

====== Greece ======
- Demosthenes tries to get the Athenians to cease depending on paid mercenaries and return to the old concept of a citizen army. He also delivers his First Philippic, warning Athenians of the folly of believing that Philip's ill health will save Athens from the Macedonians. In response, Athens' citizens vote for increased armaments.

====== Roman Republic ======
- The Etruscans are badly defeated by the Romans and abandon their attacks on the city and sue for peace.
- First use of the heavy throwing spear, the pilum, (according to Livy) in battle against the Gauls.
- Gaius Marcius Rutilus becomes the first Roman plebeian to be elected to the office of censor.

=== 350 BC ===
==== By place ====
====== Persian Empire ======
- Sidon, the centre of the revolt against Persia, seeks help from its sister city of Tyre and from Egypt but gets very little.
- Idrieus, the second son of Hecatomnus, succeeds to the throne of Caria on the death of Artemisia II, the widow of his elder brother Mausolus. Shortly after his accession, at the request of the Persian king, Artaxerxes III, Idrieus equips a fleet of 40 triremes and assembles an army of 8,000 mercenary troops and despatches them against Cyprus, under the command of the Athenian general Phocion.

====== Greece ======
- Alexander I becomes king of Epirus after his brother-in-law, Philip II of Macedon, aids him in ousting the previous king, Arymbas.
- Philip II has Abdera in Thrace sacked.

====== Roman Republic ======
- The Gauls, once more threatening Rome, are decisively beaten by an army comprising Rome and its allies.

==== By topic ====
====== Science ======
- Aristotle argues for a spherical Earth using lunar eclipses and other observations. Also he discusses logical reasoning in Organon.
- Plato proposes a geocentric model of the universe with the stars rotating on a fixed celestial sphere.

====== Art ======
- Praxiteles makes the Aphrodite of Knidos (approximate date). A composite of two similar Roman copies after the original marble is now kept at Musei Vaticani, Museo Pio Clementino, Gabinetto delle Maschere in Rome.
- The building of the Mausoleum in Halikarnassos (modern Bodrum in Turkey) is completed (approximate date). It is the grave of the Persian satrap and Carian ruler Mausolos and is built under the direction of his wife Artemisia. The mausoleum, which is considered to be one of the Seven Wonders of the Ancient World, is today partly preserved at the British Museum in London.
- The Corinthian capital is made in the tholos at Epidaurus. It is now preserved at the Archaeological Museum in Epidaurus, Greece (approximate date).

== Births ==
359 BC

- Philip III of Macedon, brother and successor of Alexander the Great (approximate date) (d. 317 BC)

358 BC

- Seleucus I Nicator, Macedonian officer of Alexander the Great and founder of the Seleucid dynasty (d. 281 BC)

356 BC

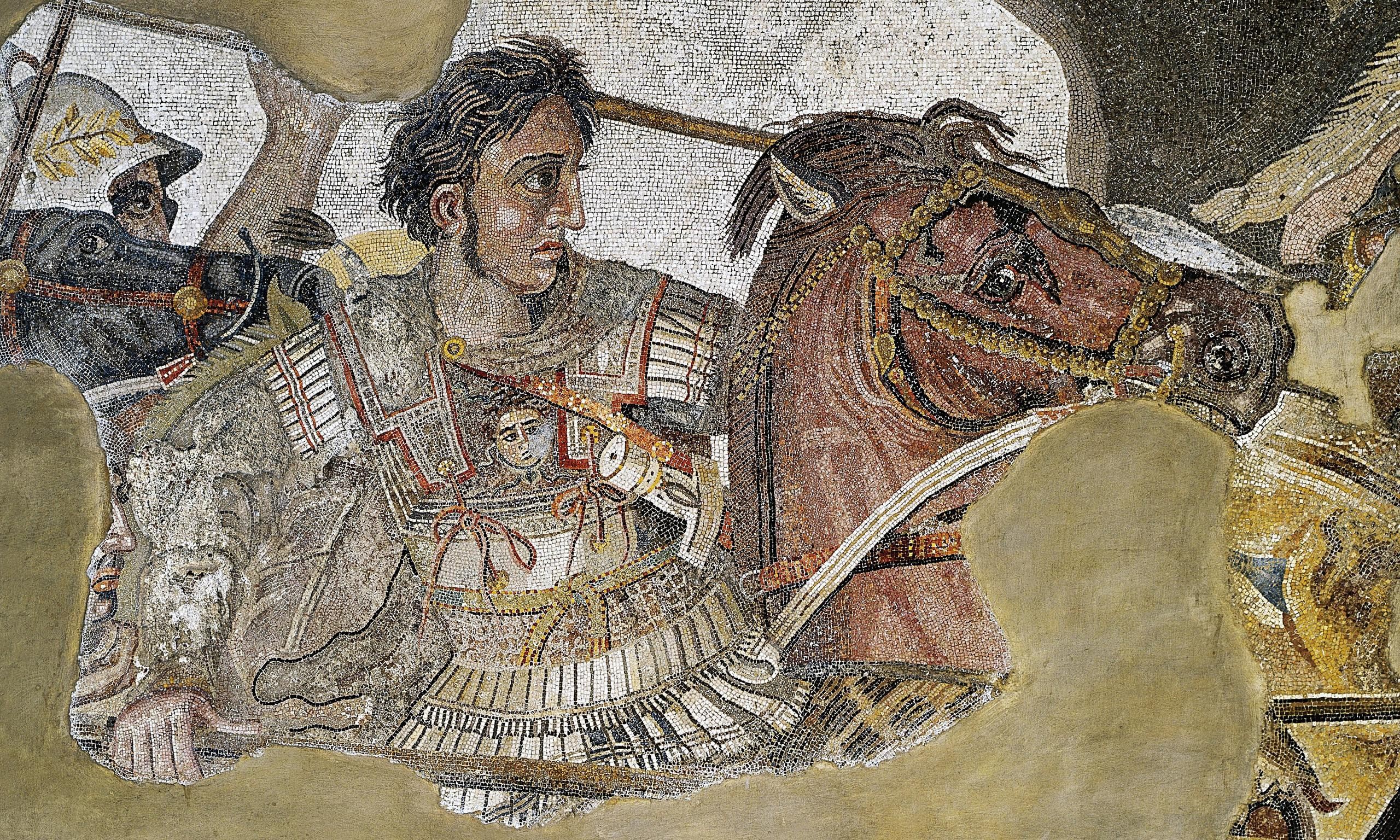
King Alexander the Great

- July 20/21 – Alexander the Great, King of Macedonia (d. 323 BC).
- Hephaestion, Macedonian general, soldier, aristocrat, and companion of Alexander the Great (d. 324 BC).

355 BC

- Cassander, companion of Alexander the Great, successor king of Macedonia and founder of Antipatrid dynasty (approximate date) (d. c. 297 BC)

354 BC

- Hieronymus of Cardia, Greek general and historian (d. 250 BC)

350 BC

- Dicaearchus, Greek philosopher, cartographer, geographer, mathematician and polymath (d. c. 285 BC)
- Megasthenes, Greek historian, diplomat and Indian ethnographer (approximate date)
- Shen Dao, Chinese philosopher known for his blend of Legalism and Taoism (approximate date) (d. c. 275 BC)

== Deaths ==
359 BC

- Perdiccas III, king of Macedonia

358 BC

- Artaxerxes II, King of Persia (b. c. 436 BC)
- Alexander of Pherae, Despot of Pherae in Thessaly, Greece
- Bardyllis, Illyrian king (killed in battle by Phillip of Macedon) (b. c. 448 BC)
- Cotys I, King of Thrace

356 BC

- Chabrias, Athenian general died at Chios
- Herostratus.
- Philistus.

355 BC

- Eudoxus of Cnidus, Greek astronomer and mathematician (b. c. 408 BC)

354 BC

- Dion, Greek [tyrant of Syracuse (assassinated) (b. c. 408 BC)
- Timotheus, Athenian statesman and general
- Xenophon, Greek historian, soldier, mercenary and an admirer of Socrates (b. c. 431 BC)

353 BC

- Clearchus of Heraclea, tyrant of Heraclea Pontica (assassinated) (b. c. 401 BC)
- Iphicrates, Athenian general (b. c. 418 BC)
- Mausolus, King and Persian satrap of Caria

350 BC

- Archytas, Greek philosopher, mathematician and statesman (or 347 BC) (b. 428 BC)
- Artemisia II, queen of Caria and sister and wife of king Mausolus of Caria
- Tollund Man, human sacrifice victim on the Jutland peninsula in Denmark, possibly the earliest known evidence for worship of the Norse god Odin (approximate date)
