= Amadocus =

Amadocus (Gr. Ἀμάδοκος) or Medocus (Μήδοκος) was a common name among the ancient Thracians. It was also, according to Ptolemy, the name of a people and mountains in Thrace.

- Amadocus I (died 390 BC), king of the Odrysae in Thrace in the 5th century BC
- Amadocus II, Thracian ruler who inherited the kingdom of Cotys I in the 4th century BC
- Amadocus, one of the princes of Thrace, who was defeated and taken prisoner by Philip V of Macedon in 184 BC
- Amadocus, Hyperborean mentioned by Pausanias
