= Hebryzelmis =

Early 4th-century BC Odrysian king of Thrace

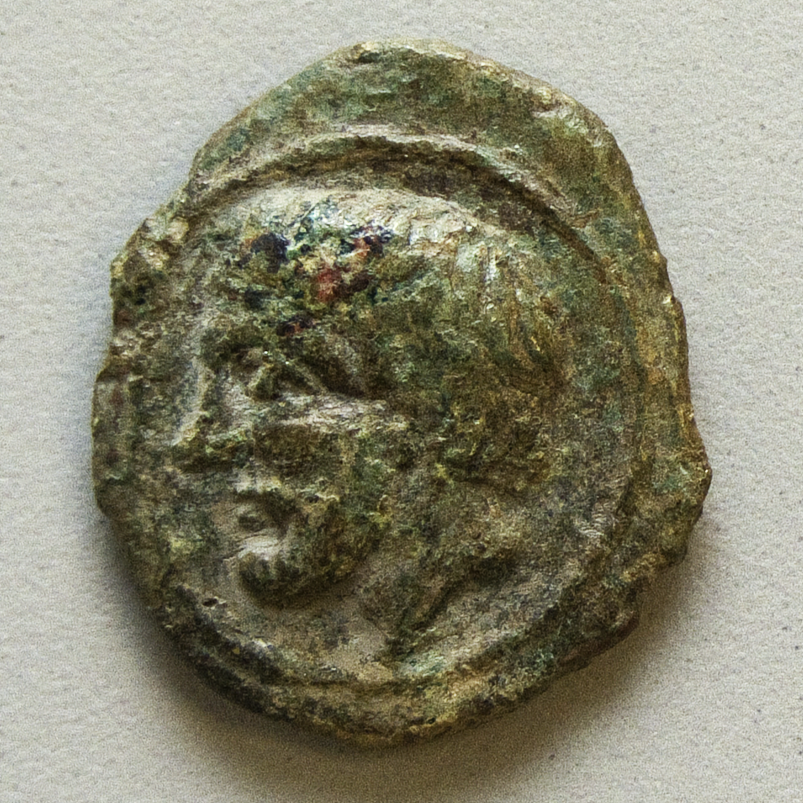
Obverse of coin depicting Hebryzelmis

Hebryzelmis (Ancient Greek: Εὐρύζελμις, Ἑβρύζελμις, Ἑβροζέλμης, Εὐρύτελμις) was an Odrysian king of Thrace, attested as ruling in 386/385 BC.

The origins of Hebryzelmis are unclear, although it has been proposed that he should be identified with the Abrozelmēs recorded as emissary and official interpreter sent by Seuthes II to Xenophon in 401/400 BC. While the two names are likely to be different Greek renditions of the same Thracian name, and Thracian princes could serve as emissaries, other considerations have led to the identification of Herbyzelmis as a member of a different, senior line of the Odrysian dynasty, and as possible son of Seuthes I and brother of his successor Cotys I. Possibly supporting this identification is a brief and poorly preserved inscription apparently dating to the 4th century BC, which mentions a certain "Herbyzelmis, (son) of Seuthes, Prianeus," although if the epithet refers to the Ionian city of Priene, the connection would be both surprising and implausible.

A major source on his reign is an Athenian decree from 386/385 BC:

When Mystichides was archon; Resolved by the boule and the demos; Erechtheis held the prytany, Cheilon of Kephisia was the president, Neon of Halai was secretary, Euandros proposed: to commend Hebryzelmis the king of the Odrysians, since he is a good man towards the demos of the Athenians, and he himself is to have all the things which his ancestors had. And also to commend [the two names originally here cannot be read] the general and... of Hebryzelmis the king. And to erect a stele on the acropolis inscribed with the decision voted by the boule, and for the inscribing of the stele the financial officials are to contribute thirty drachmae to the secretary of the boule. And to choose three men from all of the Athenians, who will report to Hebryzelmis the things decided by the demos, and report to him also concerning the ships, the ones around... and concerning the other things which the ambassadors who came from the king Hebryzelmis asked the demos of the Athenians. And to commend both Teisandros and Lysandros, since they are good men to the demos of the Athenians and...

Hebryzelmis evidently succeeded Amadocus I as the chief king of Odrysian Thrace shortly after 390/389 BC, and was apparently opposed by Amadocus' former protege and rival Seuthes II. Hebryzelmis appears to have gained the upper hand, and Seuthes II only retained (or regained) his own lands with the help of the Athenian general Iphicrates, although Athens was allied with Hebryzelmis. Apart from the Athenian decree from 386/385 BC, which praises Hebryzelmis as an ally and confers upon him the honours voted on his predecessors, the only primary sources on Hebryzelmis' reign are his four types of coins. Most of them bear a "heraldic" device of a two-handled vessel, which is also found on the coins of Cotys I and Cersobleptes and has been used to identify these rulers as members of the same branch of the royal dynasty. The quick disappearance of Hebryzelmis from the throne implied by the accession of Cotys I in 384 BC has been interpreted as evidence of foul play, but that does not necessarily follow. Conjectural inferences about antagonism between Hebryzelmis and Cotys I may be based on the alternative hypothetical identification of the Cotys as son of Seuthes II, the rival of Amadocus I and Hebryzelmis. At any rate, Hebryzelmis appears to have died in 384 BC and to have been succeeded by Cotys I.

The name Hebryzelmis appears among the sons of the later king Seuthes III by Berenice, but it is unclear whether there was any genealogical connection between the kings.

Hebrizelm Hill on Greenwich Island in the South Shetland Islands, Antarctica is named for Hebryzelmis.

Hebryzelmis Odrysian kingdom of Thrace Born: Unknown Died: 384 BC
Preceded by Amadocus I	King of Thrace before 386–384 BC	Succeeded by Cotys I
