= Aristocrates of Athens =

4th-century BC Athenian citizen

Aristocrates (in Greek Aριστoκρατης; lived 4th century BC) was a person against whom Demosthenes wrote an oration, still extant, entitled Against Aristocrates (Kατα Aριστoκρατoυς). Demosthenes wrote it shortly before 352 BC for Euthycles, who accused Aristocrates of proposing an illegal decree in relation to Charidemus, a Euboean adventurer who acted as chief minister for the Thracian king Kersebleptes and desired to regain full control of king Kotys's former dominions, which were partially under the possession of the rival Odrysian kings Amadocus II and Ketriporis.
