= Aristocrates =

Aristocrates (Ancient Greek: Ἀριστοκράτης) may refer to more than one person from ancient Greek history:

- Aristocrates of Orchomenus, tyrant of Orchomenus, c. 7th century BCE
- Aristocrates of Athens, subject of an oration of Demosthenes, c. 4th century BCE
- Aristocrates (son of Scellias), a wealthy, influential Athenian of the 4th century BCE who was used as inspiration for a character of Aristophanes
- Aristocrates of Rhodes, a general of the Rhodians around 154 BCE, apparently in the war against Crete.
- Aristocrates of Sparta, son of Hipparchus, was a historian who wrote a work on the affairs of Sparta (Λακωνικά), which is quoted by the writer Athenaeus, and is also referred to by Plutarch and other writers.
- Aristocrates (grammarian), a grammarian probably of 1st century
