= Seuthes III =

Classical-era Thracian king

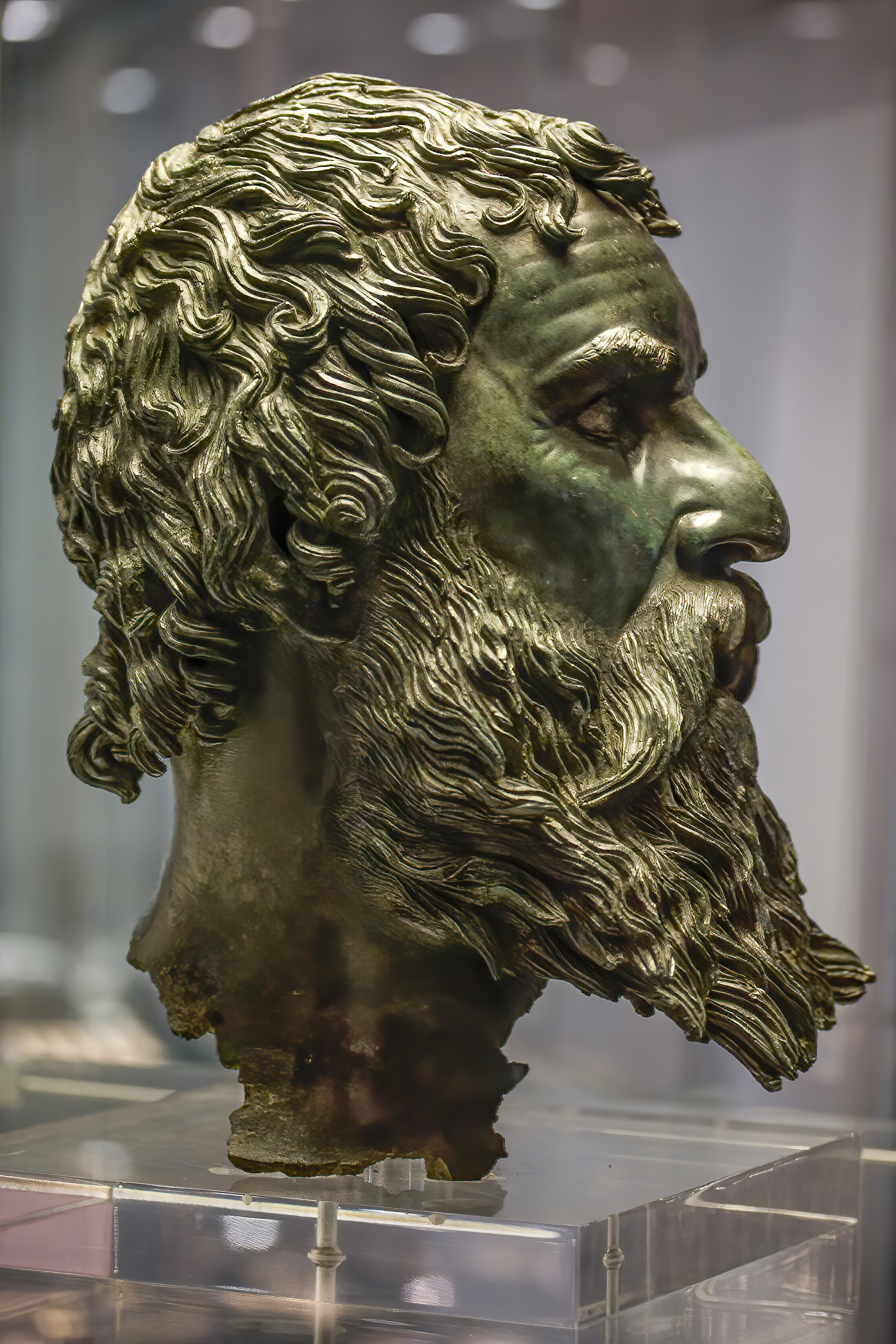
Bronze Head of Seuthes III from his tomb, sculpted by Silanion or one of his circle of sculptors

Seuthes III (Ancient Greek: Σεύθης, Seuthēs) was a Thracian king of Odrysia, a part of Thrace, during the late 4th century BC (securely attested between 324 and 312 BC).

== Historical background ==
Following the campaigns of Philip II in 347–342 BC, a significant part of Thrace became subject to Macedon. While the three main rulers of Thrace attested during this period of Philip's reign disappear from the sources by the end of the 340s BC, it remains unclear to what extent native Thracian kingship was eliminated. The kings of Macedon governed Thrace through military governors (stratēgoi): Alexander son of Aeropus (335–334 BC), Memnon (334–327 BC), Zopyrion (327–325 BC). After Philip's death in 336 BC, several Thracian tribes revolted against Philip's son Alexander the Great, who defeated the Getae and King Syrmus of the Triballi. Other Thracians sent troops to join Alexander's army, such as the Thracian prince Sitalces, attested as one of Alexander's commanders during his campaign in the East.

== Life ==
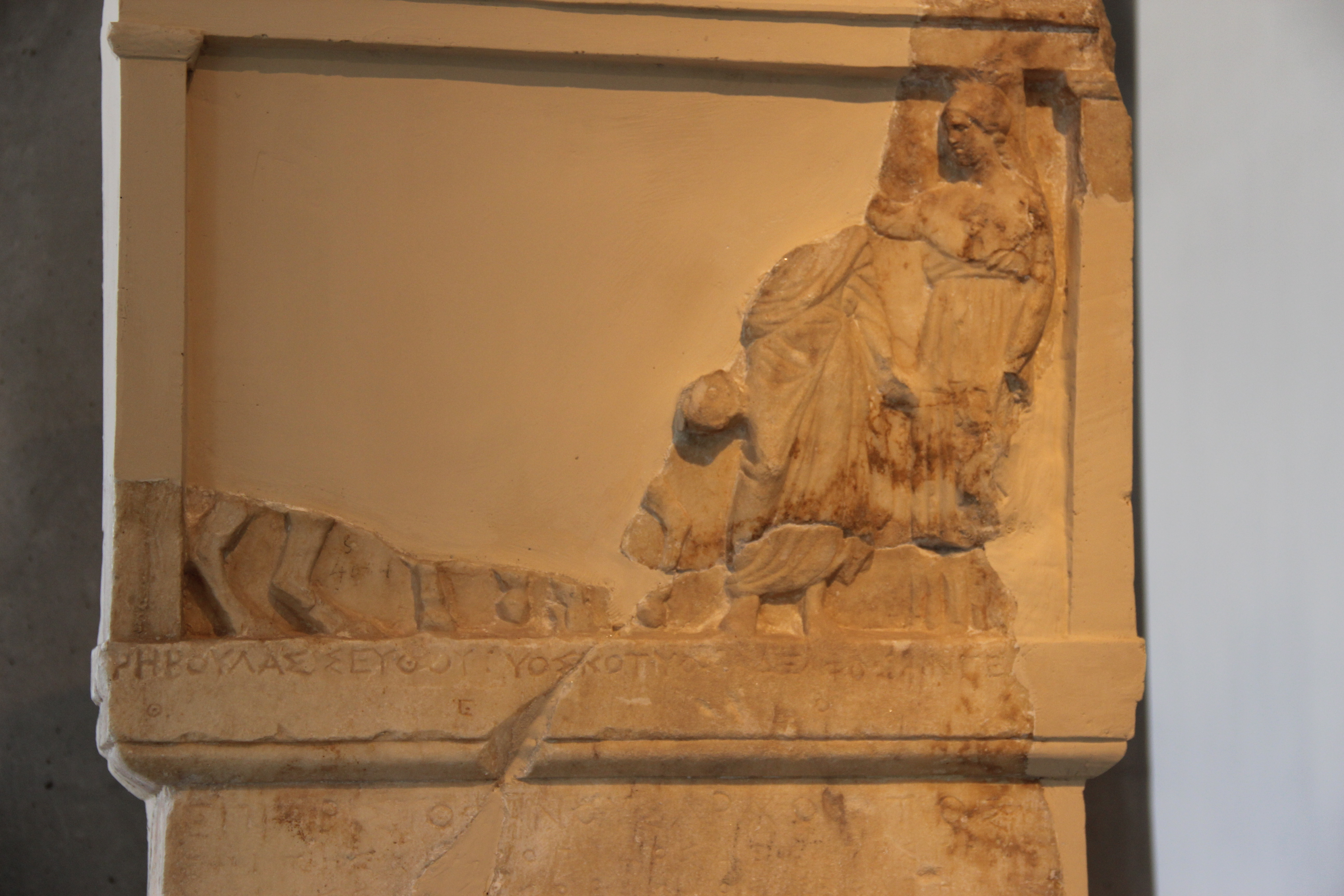
Athenian honorific decree for Rheboulas.

The origins of Seuthes III remain unclear. His historical importance has invited speculation he was closely related to his most important predecessors, for example as a putative son of Cersobleptes and brother of Alexander's commander Sitalces, although neither Seuthes nor Sitalces figure among Cersobleptes' known sons, or as a brother of Cersobleptes and son of Cotys I. Another hypothesis identifies the future Seuthes III with Cersobleptes' deputy (hyparkhos) Seuthes and posits that he was a close relative and descendant of the earlier king Seuthes I.

The attestation of Rheboulas, brother of Cotys and son of Seuthes, in an Athenian decree from 330 BC is also sometimes connected to Seuthes III, with Reboulas and Cotys identified as sons of an early marriage (they are not among the four sons of Seuthes III and Berenice attested at the end of his reign). The inscription, however, predates the first secure attestation of Seuthes III by some seven years, and various scholars have proposed Seuthes I, Seuthes II, and even a non-reigning Seuthes as the father of Cotys and Rheboulas. Historical, cultic, geographical, and numismatic considerations have led to the proposal that Seuthes III was a son (or near kinsman) of Cersobleptes' rival Teres III, and thus a representative of a "junior" line of the Odrysian royal dynasty.

If Seuthes III was already ruling in the 330s BC, he does not seem to have taken part in the revolt of the Macedonian governor Memnon against the regent Antipater in 331 BC. Seuthes revolted against Macedon in about 325 BC, after Alexander's governor Zopyrion was killed in battle against the Getae. After Alexander died in 323 BC he continued in opposition to the new governor Lysimachus, mustering a force of some 8,000 cavalry and 20,000 infantry in 322 BC. They fought each other to a draw and each withdrew from battle.

Ultimately, Seuthes appears to have acknowledged the overarching authority of Lysimachus, eventually one of Alexander's successor kings. Perhaps around 320 BC, Seuthes III established his residence at Seuthopolis (near Kazanlăk in Bulgaria), which he built and named after himself, in imitation of the Macedonian kings Philip and Alexander. In 313 BC, Seuthes III supported the revolt of Callatis (Mangalia in Romania) against Lysimachus, by allying with other towns and tribes and occupying the passes of Mount Haemus. The allies were defeated by Lysimachus, but he was forced to abandon the siege of Callatis to repel the attack of Antigonus I's commander Pausanias, sent to the aid of Callatis and its allies. Despite his defeat at the hands of Lysimachus, Seuthes III appears to have preserved his autonomy and disappears from the narrative sources. It would appear that he settled for peace with Lysimachus, who finally subdued Callatis in 310 BC.

Numismatic evidence has been used to infer that Seuthes III was still ruling at the time of the death of the Macedonian king Cassander in 297 BC. Coins apart, the sole attestation of Seuthes III after 313–312 BC comes from the so-called great inscription of Seuthopolis (IGBulg 3.2, 1731), tentatively dated to the 290s or 280s BC. It mentions Seuthes III in an unclear context (either still alive but possibly incapacitated or perhaps retrospectively, with him already deceased), his wife (or widow) Berenice (apparently a Macedonian, possibly a relative of Lysimachus), and their sons Hebryzelmis, Teres, Satocus, and Sadalas (possibly still underage), treating with Spartocus, the ruler of Cabyle. While Seuthes III is generally considered a great ruler, and certainly held his own against Alexander's successors, built a well-planned royal town (Seuthopolis) and impressive tomb (see below), and issued ample coinage in several types, it should be remembered that he ruled only part of Thrace and shared space with both the Macedonian Lysimachus and with other Thracian rulers (like the Spartocus mentioned above).

Much about his reign remains unknown, as does the succession to his authority, unitary or divided. If the Cotys and Reboulas of the Athenian decree are indeed sons of Seuthes III, it is possible Cotys II was one of his successors, although his sole certain attestation is in 330 BC. Roigos, buried in the Kazanlăk Tomb, was the son of a Seuthes, and has been tentatively but enthusiastically identified as a son of Seuthes III. He is not, however, named among the sons of Seuthes III and Berenice, and if he dates to the mid-3rd century BC (as indicated in the original reports), this may preclude identification with a son of Seuthes III from an earlier marriage. A certain Gonimase (Gonimasē), wife of a Seuthes, buried in a tomb near Smjadovo, has been proposed as Seuthes III's earlier wife and mother of Cotys and Reboulas, or of Roigos, although there is no proof for any of these associations. The obscure Seuthes IV is named as the son of a Teres on a gold ring from the tomb known as Dalakova Mogila, and geographical and chronological considerations allow the possible identification of this Teres with the Teres attested among the sons of Seuthes III and Berenice. If so, a successor of Seuthes III may have been Teres IV, father of Seuthes IV, the possible father of Roigos.

== Tomb of Seuthes III ==
The tomb of the Thracian King Seuthes III has been identified as the Golyamata Kosmatka mound, at a distance of 1 km south of the town of Shipka in Bulgaria. It was discovered in 2004 by the Bulgarian archaeologist Georgi Kitov. Items found inside included the golden wreath of the ruler, a golden kylix (shallow wine cup), greaves and a helmet, and applications for horse tackle, all exhibited in the historical museum of the town of Kazanlăk. Remarkable is the bronze head of the statue of Seuthes III buried ritually in front of the façade, which is quite detailed and realistic. It is considered important evidence for the Thracian Orphic rituals.

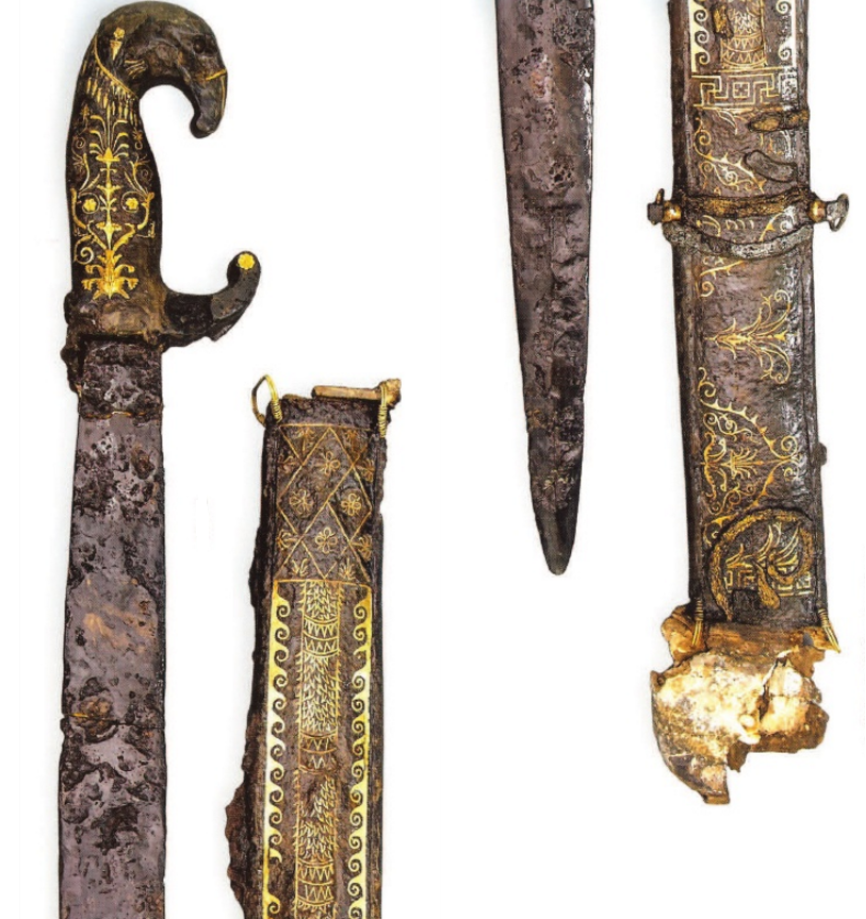
The sword of the Thracian king Seuthes III, found in his tomb. The hilt of the sword is in the shape of an eagle, gold inlaid. 3rd century BC, kept in the Museum of History Iskra, Kazanlak, Bulgaria.

The tomb consists of a corridor, an anteroom, a round chamber with high tholos ceiling, and a rectangular chamber, constructed as a sarcophagus from two monolith blocks, one weighing more than 60 tons. The three halls are built of rectangular stone blocks and are covered with slabs. A two-winged marble door closes the entrance to the round chamber. The upper plains of the wings are decorated with images of the god Dionysus, who in the east part embodies the sun and in the west the earth and night. The ritual couch was placed in the rectangular chamber. It was covered with fabric made of a golden thread. The name of Seuthes (in the genitive case, Seuthou) is found on two silver vessels and on the helmet, which indicates that they belonged to Seuthes, presumably the famous Seuthes III, founder of nearby Seuthopolis, some 10 km to the southwest.

The personal belongings and the gifts, needed for the afterlife of the ruler are carefully placed in the chamber. After the burial the entrance of the round chamber and the anteroom were blocked, the horse of the ruler was sacrificed, and the corridor was ritually set on fire.

The tomb is a part of the Valley of the Thracian Kings, which also includes the Kazanlăk Tomb (recognised as part of the UNESCO world heritage), as well as the tombs and temples found in the mounds Golyama Arsenalka, Shushmanets, Helvetsia, Grifoni, Svetitsa, and Ostrusha.

== Bibliography ==
- K. J. Beloch, Griechische Geschichte, vol. 3/2, Berlin, 1923.
- D. Dana, Inscriptions, in: J. Valeva et al. (eds.), A Companion to Ancient Thrace, Wiley, 2015: 243–264.
- P. Delev, “Filip II i zalezăt na Goljamoto Odrisko carstvo v Trakija,” Šumenski universitet “Episkop Konstantin Preslavski,” Trudove na katedrite po istorija i bogoslovie 1 (1997) 7–40.
- P. Delev, Thrace from the Assassination of Kotys I to Koroupedion (360-281 BC), in: J. Valeva et al. (eds.), A Companion to Ancient Thrace, Wiley, 2015: 48–58.
- A. Kojčev, “Trakijskite odriski carski pogrebenija, hramove i grobnici – opit za opredeljane na vladetelskata prinadležnost,” in T. Kănčeva-Ruseva (ed.), Arheologičeski i istoričeski proučvanija v Novozagorsko 2, Sofija 2008: 120–174.
- M. Manov, "The Hellenistic Tomb with Greek Inscription from Smyadovo, Bulgaria - Reconsidered," Journal of Ancient History and Archaeology 6/3 (2019) 99–118.
- M. Tačeva, The Kings of Ancient Thrace, vol. 1, Sofia, 2006.
- S. Topalov, Contributions to the Study of the Coinage and History in the Lands of Eastern Thrace from the End of the 4th C. B.C. to the end of the 3rd C. B.C., Sofia, 2001.
- R. Werner, in: W.-D. von Barloewen (ed.), Abriss der Geschichte antiker Randkulturen, Munich, 1961: 83–150, 239–242.

Seuthes III Odrysian kingdom of Thrace Born: Unknown Died: Unknown
| Preceded by Teres III ? | King of Thrace by 324 – after 312 BC | Succeeded by uncertain |
