= Teres I =

First king of the Odrysian state (ruled Unknown-445 BC)

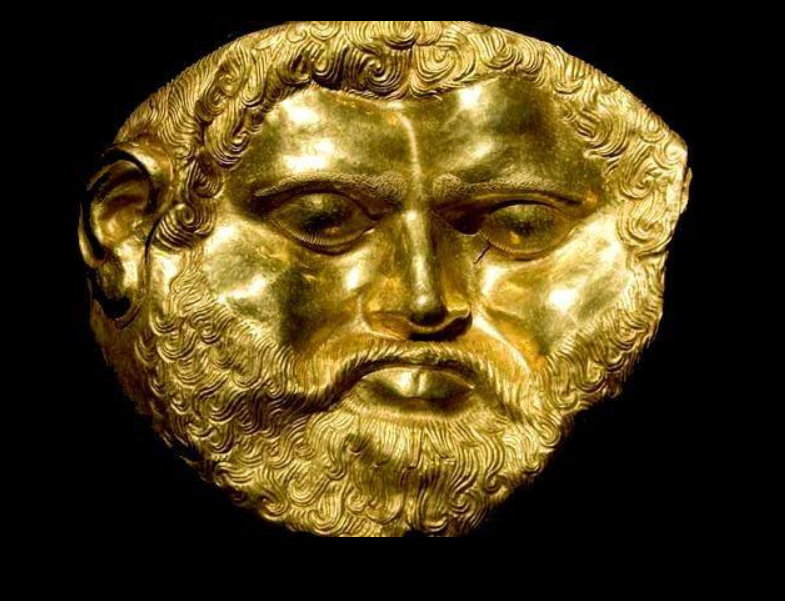
Life sized mask, possibly belonging to King Teres I (Unknown–445 BC), unearthed in a mound at the Valley of the Thracian kings, Kazanlak region, Central Bulgaria. The mask is made of 23.5 carat gold and weighs 672 g (21.6 ozt)). The sensational discovery was made by Prof. Georgi Kitov and his team in August 2004. According to him, “There have been other gold masks discovered, but all of them are made of foil-thin gold. Gold masks with this shape and weight are absolutely unknown.”

Teres I (Ancient Greek: Τήρης, Ancient Greek: [tɛ́ːrɛːs]; reigned (Unknown–445 BC) was the first king of a large, unified Odrysian kingdom of Thrace.

Teres, who united the 40 or more Thracian tribes under one banner, was well known for his military abilities and spent much of his life on the battlefield. He died during a military campaign in 445 BC. Historians argue it was against the Triballi, a Thracian tribe occupying a large amount of land to the north of Thrace.

There are few reliable sources on his reign, but it is known that "Teres was on friendly terms with the Skythians, that he had given his daughter in marriage to a Skythian ruler, that he had suffered a defeat in the hinterland of the Propontis when he was attacked by the Thynians, and that allegedly he reached the age of 92." He was succeeded by his son, Sitalces.

Teres Ridge on Livingston Island in the South Shetland Islands of Antarctica is named after Teres.

== Family ==
He had issue:

- Sitalces king of Thracian Odryses, father of Amadocus I.
- Maisades, father of Seuthes II.
- Sparatocos, father of Seuthes I.

Teres I Odrysian kingdom of Thrace Born: Unknown Died: 445 BC
Preceded by none	King of Thrace; 460–445 BC	Succeeded by Sitalkes
