= Battle of Embata =

Naval battle during the Social War (356 BC)

- Part of the Social War (357-355 BC)
Date	Autumn 356 BC
Location	Chios, Greece
Result	Chian victory

Belligerents
Athenians	Chians

Commanders and leaders
Chares of Athens; Iphicrates; Timotheos	

Strength
120 naval vessels	100 triremes

The Battle of Embata was a naval battle fought in 356 BC between the Chians and the Athenians led by Chares.

== Battle ==
The Athenians possessed a fleet of 120 naval vessels while the Chians possessed 100 galleys. This specific naval battle was fought within the straits between the island of Chios and the Anatolian mainland. The arrival of stormy weather compelled Chares's collaborators, Iphicrates and Timotheos (or Timoleon), to abandon the overall expedition. Chares, left with only one-third of his fleet, attacked the Chians and suffered defeat with heavy losses.

== Aftermath ==
On a more specific note, Iphicrates and Timotheos both commanded a supplementary force of 60 naval vessels and joined up with Chares's fleet in the summer of 356 BC. After Chares suffered defeat in the autumn expedition, he ultimately established a lawsuit against both Timotheos and Iphicrates. Timotheos faced impeachment in the aftermath of the lawsuit, which led to his ruination. As a result, Isocrates developed a personal hatred for Chares since Timotheos was one of his closest pupils.

== See also ==
- Social War (357-355 BC)
