= Mostis =

2nd-century BC Thracian Caeni tribe chieftain

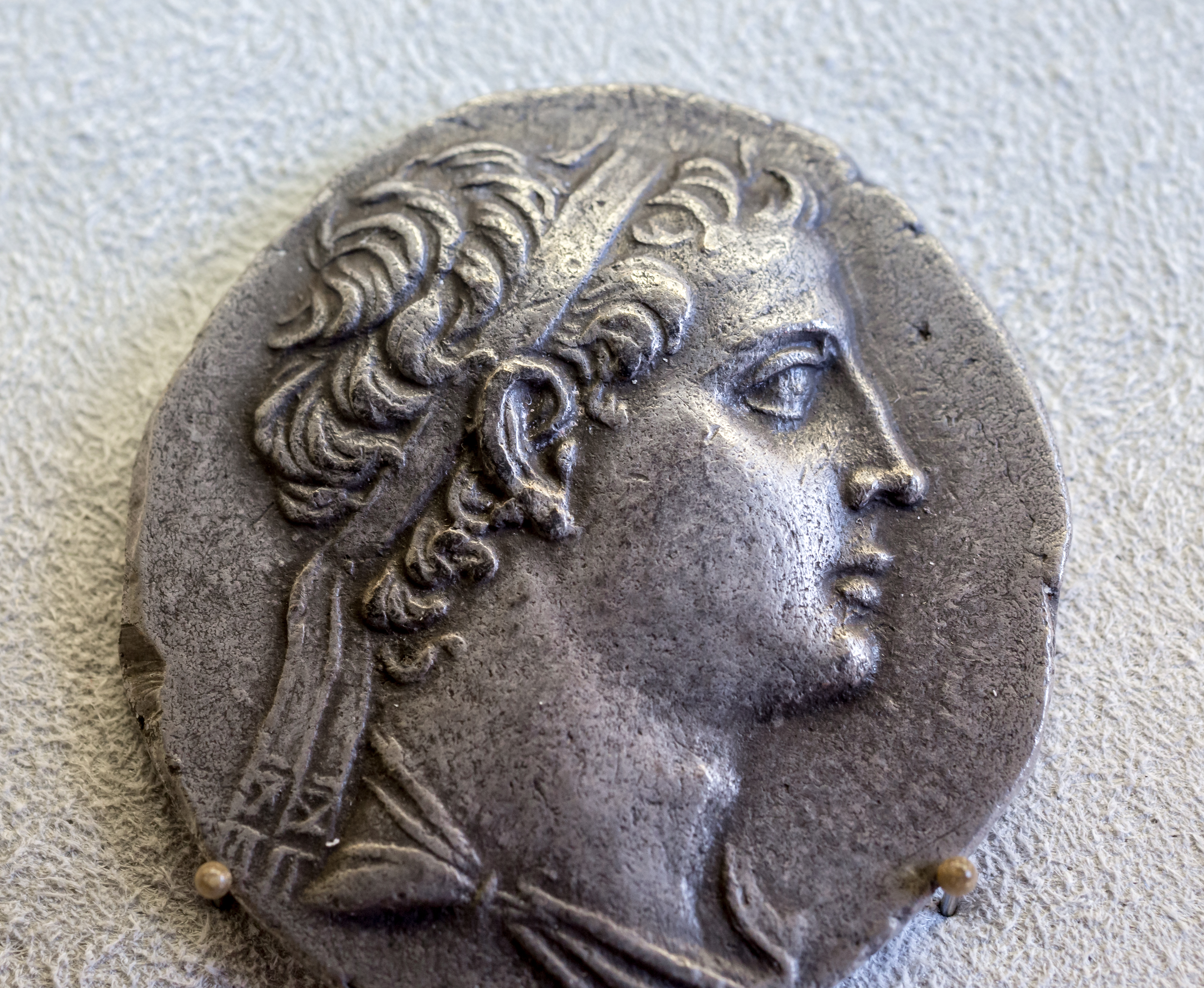
Greek coin depicting Mostis

Mostis (Ancient Greek: Μόστις) ruled from ca. 130 to 90 BC as king of the Caeni over territories in South East Thrace, Strandzha in modern-day Bulgaria and Turkey.

He is best known from his coins, bronze and silver, and from epigraphical evidence. He emerged on the political scene after the death of Ziselmius, after 135 or 133 BC or a little later in 127 BC.

Mostis coinage include - bronze coins and rare tetradrachm. On avers there are bust of king on right. More interesting is reverse side of silver coins: Athena Nikephoros seated on throne, vertical inscriptions ΒΑΣΙΛΕΩΣ ΜΟΣΤΙΔΟΣ. King Mostis coins are specific by inscription of year below throne of Athena - ΕΤΟΥΣ ΙΓ / IΔ etc. On coins from years 13/14 and 35/38 there are second inscription - ΕΠΙ ΣΑΔΑΛΟΥ.

In 2012 was found first coin hoard contained tetradrachms of Mostis. Hoard is discovered in regular archaeological research in village of Sinemorets, by Bulgarian archaeologist Ms Daniela Agre - NAIM - BAS.

Tetradrachms of Mostis can be seen in museums in London, Berlin, Paris. Coins from Sinemorets hoard are in Tsarevo museum.
