= Social War (357–355 BC) =

4th-century BC Greek civil war

Date	357–355 BC
Location	Aegean Sea, Asia Minor
Result	Confederate allies independent; Athens provoked by Persia

Belligerents
Athens and the Second Athenian League	Chios; Rhodes; Kos; Byzantion

Commanders and leaders
Chares; Chabrias †; Timotheus; Iphicrates	Numerous including: Mausolus

The Social War, also known as the War of the Allies, was fought from 357 BC to 355 BC between Athens with the Second Athenian League and the allied city-states of Chios, Rhodes, Cos and Byzantion.

== Origins ==
Provoked by Athens' increasingly dominating stance over the Second Athenian League, Chios, Rhodes, Cos and Byzantion overthrew their democratic governments and broke away from the league. The Athenian generals Chares and Chabrias were given command of the Athenian fleet.

== War ==
During midsummer of 357 BC Chabrias's fleet was defeated and he was killed in the attack on the island of Chios.

In 356 BC, the revolting allies ravaged the Athenian-loyal islands of Lemnos and Imbros but were only able to lay siege to Samos because it was defended by cleruchs.

Chares was given complete command of the Athenian fleet and withdrew to the Hellespont for operations against Byzantion. The generals Timotheus, Iphicrates and his son Menestheus were sent to help him.

At the Battle of Embata Timotheus and Iphicrates refused to engage due to a blowing gale but Chares did engage and lost many of his ships. Timotheus and Iphicrates were accused by Chares and put on trial, however only Timotheus was condemned to pay a fine, and escaped.

=== Philip II's interference ===
King Philip II of Macedon, father of Alexander the Great, used the war as an opportunity to further the interests of his Macedonian kingdom in the Aegean region. In 357 BC, Philip captured Amphipolis, a depot for the gold and silver mines from Mount Pangaion and the approach to it, as well as for timber, securing Macedon's economic and political future. He secretly offered Amphipolis to the Athenians in exchange for the valuable port Pydna; when they complied, both Pydna and Potidaea were conquered over the winter and occupied; Philip, however, did not surrender Amphipolis. He also took the city of Crenides from the Odrysae and renamed it Philippi.

=== End of the war ===
Chares was in need of money for his war effort but frowned upon asking it from home; thus, partly compelled by his mercenaries, he entered the service of Artabazus, rebel satrap of Hellespontine Phrygia. The Athenians originally approved this collaboration but then ordered it to be dropped after the Persian king Artaxerxes III Ochus complained, since they feared he would otherwise start supporting their opponents in the war.

Furthermore, as a result of increasing Athenian operations near the Persian empire, in 356 BC Persia asked Athens to leave Asia Minor and threatened war. In 355 BC, Athens, not in any shape for another war, complied and withdrew by recognizing the independence of the confederate allies.
