= Cephisodotus (general) =

4th-century BC Athenian politician and general

Cephisodotus (Greek: Κηφισόδοτος; lived 4th century BC) was an Athenian general and orator, who was sent with Callias, Autocles, and others in 371 BC to negotiate peace with Sparta. Again, in 369 BC, when the Spartan ambassadors had come to Athens to settle the terms of the desired alliance between the states, and the Athenian council had proposed that the land-forces of the confederacy should be under the command of Sparta, and the navy under that of Athens, Cephisodotus persuaded the assembly to reject the proposal, on the ground that, while Athenian citizens would have to serve under Spartan generals, few but helots (who principally manned the ships) would be subject to Athenian control. Another arrangement was then adopted, by which the command of the entire force was to be held by each state alternately for five days.

It seems to have been about 359 BC that he was sent out with a squadron to the Hellespont, where the Athenians hoped that the Euboean adventurer, Charidemus, the friend of Cephisodotus, would, according to his promise made through the latter, co-operate with him in re-annexing the Thracian Chersonese to their dominion. But Charidemus turned his arms against them, and marched in particular to the relief of Alopeconnesus, a town on the south-east of the Chersonese, of which Cephisodotus had been ordered to make himself master under the pretext of dislodging a band of pirates who had taken refuge there. Unable to cope with Charidemus, he entered into a compromise by which the place was indeed yielded to Athens, but on terms so disadvantageous that he was recalled from his command and brought to trial for his life. By a majority of only three votes he escaped sentence of death, but was condemned to a fine of five talents. This was perhaps the Cephisodotus who, in 355 BC, joined Aristophon the Azenian and others in defending the law of Leptines against Demosthenes, and who is mentioned in the speech of the latter as inferior to none in eloquence. Aristotle speaks of him as an opponent of Chares when the latter had to undergo his euthyne, or public scrutiny, after the Olynthian war, 347 BC.
