= Rabocentus =

1st century BC Thracian Bessi tribe chieftain

Rabocentus was a Thracian chief of the Bessi mentioned by Cicero.

== See also ==
- List of rulers of Thrace and Dacia
