= Cetriporis =

4th-century BC ruler of the Odrysian kingdom

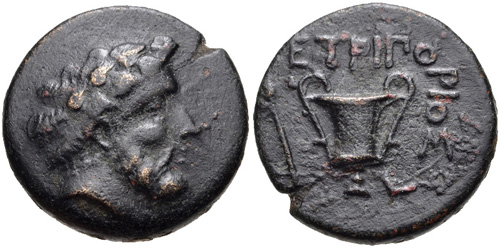
Coin struck sometime during Cetriporis' reign. Obv.: wreathed, bearded head of Dionysus facing right; rev.: a kantharos cup and thyrsus wand

Cetriporis (Ancient Greek: Κετρίπορις, romanized: Ketríporis), also known as Ketriporis, an anthroponym from the Thracian language, was a king of the Odrysian kingdom in western Thrace from c. 357-356 BC, in succession to his father Berisades, with whom he may already have been a co-ruler. He is most known for entering into an alliance with Athens, the Illyrians, and the Paeonians against Philip II of Macedonia in the summer of 356 BC, negotiated by his brother Mononius. As king, Cetriporis controlled only part of the Odrysian kingdom, the remainder being in the possession of the rival Odrysian kings Amadokus II and Kersebleptes.

After his father died, Cetriporis and his brothers were in conflict with Kersebleptes, who had declared war and plotted with the mercenary general Charidemus to eliminate Cetriporis and Amadokus as rival kings. Around the same time he was part of the coalition against Philip; however, Philip defeated the coalition between 356 and 352 BC. Cetriporis himself appears to have been subjected by Philip early, at which time the mines he possessed passed under the control of the Macedonian ruler.

== Honours ==
Ketripor Hill in Antarctica is named after Cetriporis.

== Notes ==
Cetriporis Odrysian kingdom of Thrace Born: Unknown Died: Unknown
Preceded by Berisades	King of Thrace; 352–347 BC	Succeeded by ?
