= Diegylis =

2nd century BC Thracian Caeni tribe chieftain

Diegylis (Ancient Greek: Διήγυλις) was a chieftain of the Thracian Caeni tribe and father of Ziselmius. He is described by ancient sources (such as Diodorus Siculus) as extremely bloodthirsty.

== See also ==
- List of Thracian tribes
