= Seuthes II =

Ruler of the Odrysian kingdom, 405–387 BC

Seuthes II (Ancient Greek: Σεύθης, Seuthēs) was a ruler in the Odrysian kingdom of Thrace, attested from 405 to 387 BC. While he looms large in the historical narrative thanks to his close collaboration with Xenophon, most scholars consider Seuthes II to have been a subordinate regional ruler (paradynast) and later claimant to kingship, but never the supreme king of the Odrysian state.

Seuthes II was the son of Maesades (Maisadēs), and a descendant of Teres I. Maesades had ruled as paradynast over several tribes in southeastern Thrace (the Melanditi, Thyni, and the Tranipsi) west of Byzantium, but he had been expelled in unclear circumstances. His young son Seuthes then became the ward of Medocus/Amadocus I, who eventually restored him in parts of his father's lands, including Bisanthe, although others remained in the possession of another paradynast, a certain Teres II. Amadocus I and Seuthes II appear to have been ruling by 405 BC, when the exiled Athenian commander Alcibiades boasted of his friendship with them to his fellow Athenians.

Xenophon, whom Seuthes II hired as a mercenary commander in the winter of 401/400 BC, describes Seuthes as the subordinate of Amadocus I. Xenophon and his mercenaries (remnants of the Ten Thousand who had followed Cyrus the Younger into Persia) assisted Seuthes during a brief but effective campaign that eliminated local opposition to his rule in eastern Thrace. The mercenaries then passed into Spartan service in Asia Minor, and soon afterwards Seuthes sent the Spartan commander Dercylidas as Thracian auxiliaries in Bithynia 200 horsemen and 300 peltasts. However, with the declining fortunes of the Spartans in the area, Seuthes shifted to an alliance with Athens and Persia by 394 BC.

As Seuthes II's position improved, he rebelled against Amadocus I: Seuthes despised and attacked his overlord by 391 BC, and the Athenian general Thrasybulus had to reconcile Amadocus I and Seuthes II and to renew their alliance with Athens in 390/389 BC. Seuthes may have quarreled with Amadocus II or his successor Hebryzelmis again; he was rescued from unspecified foes by the Athenian commander Iphicrates. Seuthes II is last mentioned in 387 BC, among the Athenian allies represented at the conclusion of the Peace of Antalcidas/King's Peace.

Seuthes II had a daughter, whom he offered in marriage to Xenophon in 401/400 BC, and possibly another daughter, whom he offered in marriage to Thrasybulus in 390/389 BC. Seuthes II is often identified as the father of the later king Cotys I, but the latter's parentage is unclear, and Seuthes I may be a more likely candidate for his father.

Seuthes II Odrysian kingdom of Thrace Born: Unknown Died: after 387 BC
Preceded by Amadocus I	King in Thrace by 405–after 387 BC	Succeeded by ? Cotys I
