= Sparatocos =

5th-century BC king of the Odrysian kingdom of Thrace

Sparadocos (Ancient Greek, Σπαράδοκος) was a king of the Odrysian kingdom of Thrace from ca. 450 BC to before 431 BC, succeeding his father, Teres I.

== Family ==
His son was:

- Seuthes I.

== See also ==
- List of Thracian tribes
