= Crenides (Macedonia) =

Ancient Greek city in Macedonia

Coordinates: 41°00′47″N 24°17′03″E

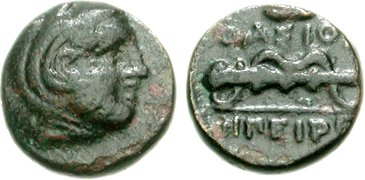
Bronze stater from Crenides, featuring Heracles with a club and bow, 360-356 BCE

Crenides or Krenides (Ancient Greek: Κρενίδες) was an ancient Greek city located in Thrace, and later in ancient Macedonia, located in the region between the river Strymon and the river Nestos. It was founded by colonists from Thasos in 360 BCE. Crenides was close to Mount Pangaion with its rich gold veins and to another Thasian colony, Datos. The two colonies provoked the Thracians but at the same time gave Philip II of Macedon the justification for penetrating the area and founding Philippi in 356 BCE. Philip intervened to protect the city when it was threatened by the Thracians under Kersobleptes.

== See also ==
- Greek colonies in Thrace
