= Cotys I (Odrysian) =

King of the Odrysians in Thrace from 384 to 360 BC

King of Thrace
- Reign: 384–360 BC
- Predecessor: Hebryzelmis
- Successor: Cersobleptes
- Died: 360 BC
- Issue: Cersobleptes

Cotys I or Kotys I (Ancient Greek: Κότυς, romanized: Kotys) was a king of the Odrysians in Thrace from 384 BC to his murder in 360 BC.

== Early life ==
Cotys was known to have been born during the reign of Seuthes I, based on ancient sources and date of birth estimates for Cotys, his daughter who married the Athenian general Iphicrates, and her son Menestheus. According to Harpokration, he reigned for 24 years, which places his accession in 384 BC. Although his origins are actually unknown, an Athenian inscription dated to 330 BC honors Reboulas, brother of Cotys and son of king Seuthes. As the ordinal of Seuthes is not mentioned, it was unclear which of the preceding kings named Seuthes is meant by the inscription. While scholars originally believed Seuthes II to be the father of Cotys I, now it is known that Seuthes I was his father, as Seuthes II was only 7 years old at the time of Seuthes I's abdication in 411 BC.

In 390 BC, the Athenian general Iphicrates joined his colleague Thrasybulus in Thrace, helping arrange peace between the Thracian rulers Amadocus I and Seuthes II, and making both Athenian allies. Iphicrates remained for about two years, and married the daughter of Cotys in opulent circumstances. Cotys' precise standing at the time remains obscure, but he is tentatively identified as a brother of Hebryzelmis, who was the Odrysian king in Thrace in 386/385 BC, when he was honored in an Athenian decree.

== Early reign ==
Shortly afterwards, in 384 BC, Cotys I became king, perhaps at first in the interior parts of Thrace. With the help of Iphicrates, Cotys succeeded in establishing himself as the heir of Hebryzelmis, and eliminating the opposition of his rivals, possibly including Amadocus II and Saratocus. Archaeological finds of items inscribed for Cotys to the north and west suggest expansion and contacts in that direction that have escaped the narrative sources. The name of Cotys (in one instance described as a son of the god Apollon) appears several times on objects from the Rogozen Treasure, although the precise manner in which it came to be buried in northwestern Bulgaria, presumably in the territory of the Triballi, remains unclear.

== Conflict with Athens ==
As Cotys tried to enlarge his kingdom, including towards the Aegean and the Chersonese, his actions led to increasing tensions with Athens. In the early 370s BC, the Second Athenian Confederacy was founded with a number of neighboring cities and islands joining the Confederacy as a safeguard against the threat from Cotys, among others.

In 375 BC Cotys probably supported Hales, leader of Triballi, a powerful Thracian tribe in northwestern Thrace, in their attack on the city of Abdera. According to Diodorus, the city was saved only after the intervention of the Athenian general, Chabrias, whose forces then garrisoned the city. In 367 BC Ariobarzanes, the Persian satrap of Phrygia, occupied Sestos. Following Ariobarzanes' revolt against the Persian king Artaxerxes II in 365 BC, Cotys apparently opposed Ariobarzanes and his ally, Athens, but his actions are ambivalent and unclear. The same year Cotys welcomed the return of his son-in-law, the dismissed Athenian general Iphicrates, and a new ally, the mercenary commander Charidemus, who married another daughter of Cotys. The Athenians under their general Timotheus were able to gain Sestos and Krithote. Soon after, in 363 or 362 BC, Cotys sent Miltokythes into the Thracian Chersonese to take Sestos. Miltokythes besieged the city and starved it into surrender, then attacked Krithote. Athenian generals sent to relieve the attacked towns were unsuccessful.

At this time, in 362 BC, however, Miltokythes rebelled against Cotys, seizing the royal treasury at Hieron Oros and, finding himself besieged there by Cotys, appealed for help to both Ariobarzanes and Athens. Cotys also appealed for help from Athens, and allied himself to the Persian satrap of Lydia Autophradates, enemy of Ariobarzanes. Athens chose to support Miltokythes, and sent a fleet to his aid, but this was defeated by Cotys with the help of his son-in-law Iphicrates. Miltokythes was forced to abandon Hieron Oros in spring 361 BC, and Cotys now besieged Sestos. Athens now allied with Sparta against Cotys. Ariobarzanes surrendered Sestos and Kritothe to the Athenian general Timotheus, and the Athenians dispatched two more commanders to aid Miltokythes against Cotys. Nevertheless, Cotys prevailed with the continued assistance of Iphicrates and Charidemus. According to Demosthenes, they bribed the Athenian military and naval commanders, and several were tried and condemned after being recalled to Athens. Despite an attempt for peace between Athens and Cotys, proclaiming him an ally, Charidemus is found besieging the last remaining Athenian fortresses in the southern Chersonese again in 360 BC.

== Death ==
By 360 BC, Cotys controlled almost all of the Chersonese peninsula, and the Athenians dispatched a new commander, Charidemus' friend Cephisodotus to the area. By the time Cephisodotus arrived in the last week of September 360 BC, Cotys had been murdered by two of Plato’s students from Aenus, Python and Heraclides. Thought previously to be close to the king, they murdered him during a feast in his palace, under the pretext that he had wronged their father. Upon their return to Athens, they were proclaimed honorary citizens and rewarded with gold wreaths. Python is said to have told the Athenians that "God did this, borrowing from me the hand that did the deed." Identifying an unnamed Thracian king met by Philip II of Macedon with Cotys, some authors had put Cotys' death in 359 BC, assuming it took place after Philip II's accession; this is still found cited in the literature, but the chronology of Cephisodotus' arrival in 360 BC is certain. Philip may have met Cotys before becoming king of Macedon and, moreover, it is not certain that the Thracian king in question should be identified with Cotys.

== Legacy ==
Cotys I was the last ruler of a relatively unified Thrace for centuries. On his death, his son and heir Cersobleptes found himself opposed by Amadocus II (son of Amadocus I and possibly already a rival to Cotys in the early 370s BC) and Berisades (son or descendant of Saratocus?), as well as Miltokythes and a certain Spokes. While Cersobleptes managed to eliminate some of these foes with the continued support of Charidemus (who captured and executed Miltokythes in 357 BC), he had to accept a partition of the kingdom with Amadocus II and Berisades. The division of Odrysian Thrace was exploited by Philip II of Macedon to impose his control over the area.

Cotys I had several children, including a daughter who married Iphicrates probably before 387 BC, another daughter who married Charidemus probably after 365 BC, a son named Cersobleptes who succeeded his father on the throne in 360 BC, and possibly a second son named Seuthes, who may have served as Cersobleptes' deputy (hyparkhos) and may have become king as Seuthes III (these identifications are hypothetical and debated).

== Character ==
As a former ally of Athens who became a dangerous foe, Cotys I has been portrayed in a fairly negative light in our sources, depicted as irritable, intemperate, drunken, inordinately cruel, and perfidious, most notably in the polemics of Demosthenes. Plutarch provides a more nuanced depiction of Cotys' character in the following anecdote: Cotys, when one gave him a leopard, gave him a lion in return. He was naturally prone to anger, and punished the mistakes of his servants severely. When a stranger brought him some earthen vessels, thin and brittle, but delicately shaped and admirably adorned with carvings, he rewarded the stranger for them, and then broke them all into pieces, "Lest (he said) my passion should provoke me to punish those that break them excessively."

== In popular culture ==
- Cotys I appears in the 2014 film Hercules portrayed by John Hurt. Here, Cotys is depicted as the main antagonist as King of Thrace during the year 361 BC. Unlike in the film, the actual Cotys I, never features in the mythology of Heracles/Hercules.

Cotys I (Odrysian) Odrysian kingdom of Thrace Born: Unknown Died: 360 BC
Preceded by Hebryzelmis	King of Thrace; 384–360 BC	Succeeded by Cersobleptes, Berisades and Amadocus II
