= Zopyrion =

Ancient Macedonian general

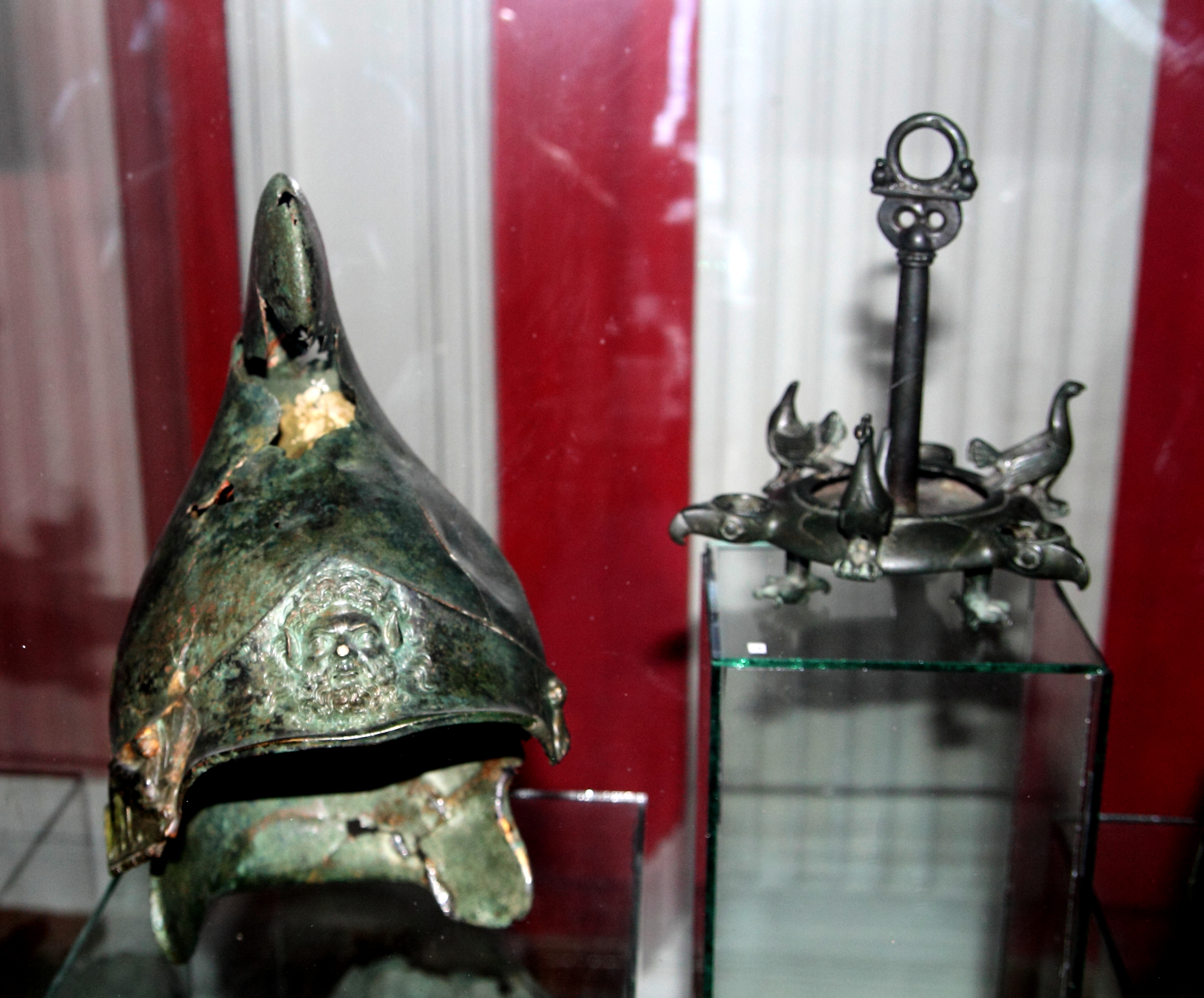
One of 6 helmets discovered in Olanesti, Moldova, from Zopyrion's army

Zopyrion (Ancient Greek: Ζωπυρίων) (died 331 BC) was a Macedonian general.

Zopyrion was made a governor either of Thrace or of Pontus by Alexander the Great. In 331 BC, he led an invasion of Scythian lands, "thinking that, if he did not attempt something, he should be stigmatized as indolent".

For this purpose, he collected a force of thirty thousand men. They marched along the Black Sea coast and besieged Olbia, a colony of Miletus (which was taken by Alexander in 334 BC). But the Olbians "gave freedom to their slaves, granted the rights of citizenship to foreigners, changed promissory notes and thus managed to survive the siege". They also made an alliance with the Scythians and possibly some other Greek communities in the area. Curtius Rufus mentions a great storm on the sea that devastated the Macedonian navy. Zopyrion, lacking resources to continue the siege, decided to retreat. On his way back, Scythians destroyed his army by constant raids. Defeat was probably accomplished beyond the Danube by Getae and Triballi avenging Alexander's devastation of their lands in 335 BC. Zopyrion perished with his troops in the winter at the end of 331 BC.

Alexander the Great learnt about his fate from a letter from Antipater in Macedonia the same year, along with deaths of Agis, King of Sparta, in Greece, and of Alexander, king of Epirus, in Italy. Alexander the Great "was affected with various emotions, but felt more joy at learning of the deaths of two rival kings, than sorrow at the loss of Zopyrion and his army".
