= Aristocrates (grammarian) =

Grammarian of Ancient Greece

Aristocrates (Ancient Greek: Ἀριστοκράτης) was a grammarian (or "schoolmaster") of Ancient Greece who despite being described as a "grammarian" is nevertheless mostly remembered as the source of a remedy for toothache passed down by either the elder or younger Andromachus, and later quoted by medical annalist Galen. Because he was not described as himself being a doctor or scientist, but is quoted by later medical scientists, he is sometimes referred to as an example or practitioner of Ancient Greek folk or traditional medicine.

He must have lived at some time in or before the first century. He is also quoted by John Cramer in his Anecdota Graeca.
