= Ziselmius =

2nd century BC Thracian Caeni tribe chieftain

Ziselmius, Zibelmius, Zibelmios or Zisemis (Ancient Greek: Ζισέλμιος) was a chieftain of the Thracian Caeni tribe and son of Diegylis. Both Ziselmius and his father are mainly known due to the writings of Diodorus of Sicily who described them as cruel barbarians and guilty of acts of incredible savagery.

== History ==
Around 148 - 146 BC, after the attempted usurpation of a man named Bizes (perhaps his uncle Bithyas?), Zibelmios succeeded his father and avenged him in a barbaric and bloody way by punishing his adversaries and all their family, cutting some into pieces, putting others on the cross, burning the rest alive, whose flesh he served to those closest to the family, equaling the ancient feasts of Tereus and Thyestes.

Tired of this cruelty, the Thracians reportedly seized Zibelmios, and competed among themselves for the choice of tortures to inflict on their prisoner.

== See also ==
- List of Thracian tribes
