= Amadocus I =

5th and 4th-century BC Thracian king

Amadocus I (Ancient Greek: Ἀμάδοκος, Amadokos, also Amatokos, perhaps more accurately Μήτοκος/Μήδοκος, Mētokos/Mēdokos, of which the Latin form would be Medocus) was a Thracian king of the Odrysae in the late 5th to early 4th century BC (attested from before 405 BC to after 390/389 BC).

On the basis of circumstantial evidence, Medocus/Amadocus I has been identified as the son of Sitalces and a representative of the so-called "junior" branch of the Odrysian dynasty. Isocrates refers to him as "Amadokos the Elder," while a fragment of Theopompus specifies that there were two kings named Amadocus, father and son, of whom the son was a contemporary of Philip II of Macedon. Amadocus I is thus the father of Amadocus II. Most modern historians consider Medocus and Amadocus I the same individual.

Medocus/Amadocus I apparently succeeded Seuthes I on the Odrysian throne, and is named as king of the Odrysians already in 405 BC, alongside a Seuthes, who is generally identified as Seuthes II. At the time of the Battle of Aegospotami in 405 BC, the Athenian statesman and commander Alcibiades described the Thracian kings Medocus and Seuthes as his allies. Medocus/Amadocus I made his ward Seuthes II a subordinate king in part of southeastern Thrace, but without restoring all of the territory that had once belonged to Seuthes II's father Maesades, some of which remained in the hands of a certain Teres II. In the winter of 400/399 BC Seuthes II received the services of the Athenian commander Xenophon and his mercenaries. Xenophon describes Medocus/Amadocus I as Seuthes I's overlord and protector, and records that he lived in the interior of the country, some twelve days from the coast. Seuthes II eventually rebelled against Medocus/Amadocus I: Seuthes despised and attacked his overlord, and the Athenian general Thrasybulus had to reconcile Medocus/Amadocus I and Seuthes II and to renew their alliance with Athens in 390/389 BC.

Medocus/Amadocus I introduced the "heraldic" device of a double-headed axe (labrys) on the coins of Odrysian rulers, continued on the issues of several members of his branch of the dynasty.

Medocus/Amadocus I probably died soon after 390/389 BC.

Amadok Point on Livingston Island in the South Shetland Islands, Antarctica is named for Amadocus.

Amadocus I Odrysian kingdom of Thrace Born: Unknown Died: after 390 BC
Preceded by Seuthes I	King of Thrace before 405 – after 390 BC	Succeeded by Hebryzelmis
