= Seuthes I =

5th-century BC king of the Odrysians in Thrace

Seuthes I (/ˈsuːˌθiːz/; Ancient Greek: Σεύθης, Seuthēs) was king of the Odrysians in Thrace from 424 BC until at least 411 BC.

Seuthes was the son of Sparatocos (Sparadocus), and the grandson of Teres I. While his father Sparadocus is the first Odrysian monarch to have left proven coinage, Seuthes succeeded his uncle Sitalces on the throne in 424 BC. Although the contemporary Thucydides merely indicates that Sitalces died during the course of an unsuccessful campaign against the Triballi and was succeeded by his nephew Seuthes, the circumstances, paired with a later accusation of Philip II of Macedon against the Athenians (that on the death of Sitalces, whom they had admitted to their citizenship, they immediately made an alliance with his murderer), some scholars have seen Seuthes' accession as the result of a conspiracy. This does not necessarily follow, and Seuthes is already described as Sitalces' highest official before his succession to the throne. Others have pointed out the probability that the Odrysians followed the principle of tanistry when it came to the succession, and that as son of Sitalces' apparently older brother, Seuthes may have had a prior claim over Sitalces' sons.

Already before his accession to the throne, Seuthes had married Stratonike, a sister of king Perdiccas II of Macedon, as part of a peace settlement between his uncle and the king of Macedon in 429 BC. The prospect of the marriage and dowry are said to have induced Seuthes to counsel his uncle to withdraw his forces from Macedon. After becoming king, Seuthes I raised the tribute due to his treasury, and was able to collect some 400 talents in silver and gold per year, not counting gifts presented to the king. Perhaps because of his alliance with Perdiccas, who allied with Sparta, Seuthes did not support the Athenians in their contest with Sparta for possession of Amphipolis in 425–423 BC, nor against Perdiccas in 418–415 BC. Whether Seuthes' policy was due to loyalty, to prudent neutrality in the face of rapidly changing conditions and alliances, to preference for peace, or to incapacitation due to weakening of control over subject peoples is unclear. He appears to have died after 411 BC, as Thucydides' history does not record his death or the appearance of his successor. In 405 BC the exiled Athenian commander Alcibiades boasted of his friendship with the Thracian kings Medocus/Amadocus I and Seuthes to the other Athenian commanders before the Battle of Aegospotami. While some scholars believe this is one last reference to Seuthes I, others point to the explicitly stated close connections between Medocus/Amadocus I and Seuthes II, and consider him to be the Seuthes in question. On this basis, Amadocus I is believed to have succeeded to the throne by 405 BC.

Seuthes I has been identified as the probable father of the later kings Hebryzelmis and Cotys I, although Cotys is often given as a son of Seuthes II.

Seuthes I Odrysian kingdom of Thrace Born: Unknown Died: ?410 BC
Preceded by Sitalkes	King of Thrace; 424 – after 411 BC	Succeeded by Amadocus I
