= Charidemus =

4th-century BC Greek mercenary leader

Charidemus (or Kharidemos, Ancient Greek: Χαρίδημος), of Oreus in Euboea, was an ancient Greek mercenary leader of the 4th century BC. He had a complicated relationship with Athens, sometimes aiding the city in its efforts to secure its interests in the northern Aegean, sometimes working against it. He was castigated by Demosthenes in his oration Against Aristocrates for repeated treacherous actions toward Athens, yet later he received Athenian citizenship and was elected one of its generals. In this capacity he ran afoul of Alexander III (the Great) of Macedon and was ordered into banishment after the destruction of Thebes in 335. He retired to Persia, where he was first honored by the Great King, but was later executed after sneering at the quality of the Persian army.

== Biography ==
=== Early life ===
Charidemus was probably born in the early 390s BCE in Oreus, a city in northern Euboea (near Histiaea) of a citizen mother and non-citizen father named Philoxenus. His first military action is presumed to have been against an Athenian attack on Oreus led by its general Chabrias in 377, during which he served as a light-infantry soldier. Following this he spent some years as a pirate.

=== Early military career ===
By 368 Charidemus was leading a mercenary force that was hired by the Athenian general Iphicrates to assist in an effort to retake Amphipolis, a colony established by Athens near the mouth of the Strymon River in Thrace in 437. Athens had lost control of it during the Peloponnesian War and had never regained it. At this time it was under the protection of Olynthus, the major city of the Chalcidice Peninsula. This campaign lasted three years and was unsuccessful.

In 365, though, Iphicrates had secured a group of hostages from Amphipolis that, it was hoped, would facilitate the surrender of the city. Before negotiations could take place, Athens relieved Iphicrates and replaced him with Timotheus, who had been conducting campaigns in Samos, Anatolia, and the Thracian Chersonese. Iphicrates was ordered to convey the hostages to Athens, but assigned that duty to Charidemus and then went north into Thrace to the court of its king, Cotys, who was his father-in-law (and an enemy of Athens). Charidemus, instead of taking the hostages to Athens, returned them to Amphipolis, thus ruining Athens’ chance to reassume control over it.

The exact timing of these events is unclear, as is Iphicrates’ reason for not returning to Athens with the hostages. Was he offended by his recall? Had he secretly told Charidemus to give up the hostages? Or was his family tie to Cotys simply stronger than his loyalty to his home city? These questions remain unanswered.

When Timotheus arrived in theater, he attempted to rehire Charidemus and his troops, but the latter declined the offer and sailed, with the Athenian ships entrusted to him, to Cardia at the north end of the Chersonese to join Cotys and help defend it from Athenian attack. When Timotheus decided to continue the attempt to retake Amphipolis, thus leaving Cardia free from attack, Charidemus returned to the area ostensibly to join in the defense of Amphipolis. Confronted by Timotheus before he could do this, he gave in to Timotheus’ pressure and rejoined the Athenian campaign.

During the next three years, Timotheus tried to break the Olynthian hold on Amphipolis by attacking a series of cities in the Chalcidice Peninsula in order to draw it out, but the Olynthians did not take the bait. During this time, Charidemus and his mercenaries continued to fight for Athens. In 362, after two direct attempts to take Amphipolis, Timotheus was recalled to Athens and Charidemus was released from service.

=== Satrap Revolt ===
The late 360s were the time of the Satrap Revolt. This was a chaotic attempt by several satraps to wrest control of their territories away from the Great King of Persia, Artaxerxes II. In order to understand Charidemus’ role in it, we need to back up a bit.

Pharnabazus, the satrap of Phrygia, in northwest Anatolia, left his post in 388/7 and spent the rest of his life in the court of Artaxerxes. At that time his son, Artabazus, was too young to assume command and his older brother (or uncle – the meaning of the Greek is unclear), Ariobarzanes, served as regent. When Artabazus reached adulthood, Ariobarzanes refused to relinquish the throne and the young man went into exile.

In 362, after having married and raised two daughters, Artabazus was captured and imprisoned by Autophradates, satrap of Lydia. His sons-in-law, Memnon and Mentor, seeking help in freeing him, hired Charidemus and his mercenaries upon their release from Athenian service. Charidemus, having, as usual, no regard for promises made, soon abandoned this effort and, with his mercenaries, occupied three small towns in the interior of Phrygia: Scepsis, Cebren, and Ilium – presumably to create a small fiefdom for himself. Unfortunately for him, Artabazus was soon released and gathered an army to attack him. Holed up in a land-locked fortress with no way to import supplies, Charidemus was faced with the prospect of a long siege and eventual starvation. To forestall this, he wrote to the Athenian general Cephisodotus, who was then on campaign against Cotys in the Chersonese, promising to assist him in securing control of the region if he would only get him out of his current predicament. Hearing of this and seeing a way out of the situation without resorting to war, Memnon and Mentor persuaded Artabazus to give Charidemus and his forces free passage to the coast, after which, instead of joining forces with Cephisodotus, the mercenary went straight to Cardia to assist Cotys in its defense against the Athenians.

=== Advisor to Cersobleptes ===
In 360, Cotys was assassinated. His son Cersobleptes assumed control of eastern Thrace, while his brothers — Berisades and Amadocus — ruled over the central and western portions of the region. Charidemus attached himself to the young king as a trusted advisor, most effectively by marrying his sister, and during the ensuing years, he and his army of mercenaries preyed repeatedly on Athenian forces in the Propontis (now Sea of Marmara), the Hellespont, and the Chersonese. Athens sent a series of generals to deal with the situation. When they had the upper hand, Cersobleptes and Charidemus would agree to terms, but then violate them when Athenian forces were withdrawn.

=== Athenian citizenship ===
In 357 BC, on the arrival of Chares with considerable forces, the Cersobleptes finally ceded the Chersonese to Athens under terms acceptable to Athens. In this he was no doubt motivated by Philip of Macedon's taking of Amphipolis and its implied threat to all of Thrace. As a reward for this commitment and at his request, Athens granted Charidemus citizenship and other unspecified honors.

Charidemus’ relationship with Athens, however, continued to be problematic for the city, most especially in the attempts he and Cersobleptes subsequently made to conquer the whole of Thrace, in violation of their agreement. Among those most concerned was the orator Demosthenes. On the other hand, Charidemus also had his supporters. In 352, one of these, Aristomachus, proxenos (representative) for Cersobleptes at Athens, declared before the Assembly that “Charidemus was the only man in the world who could recover Amphipolis for Athens, and advised you to appoint him as general”. At the same time, Aristocrates, proposed a decree to the Athenian Ecclesia (Assembly) that granted Charidemus immunity from any act of violence committed against him. This protection covered not just actions by Athenians, but by anyone, anywhere. Since he was involved in military actions within Thrace, this would put anyone who might harm him outside the protection of Athenian law and make it less likely that his efforts would be opposed.

Before it could be enacted, though, Euthykles sued Aristocrates in court, accusing him of a decree that was not only illegal, but false in its praise of Charidemus and against the best interests of Athens. His argument before the court, written by Demosthenes, has been preserved as his oration number twenty-three, Against Aristocrates, and is the source for most of what we know about Charidemus. Whether Euthykles succeeded in ultimately blocking this decree is not known, but Charidemus was ultimately elected one of Athens’ ten generals, for the year 351/0 if not before.

In the fall of 351, he took a fleet of ten ships to the Hellespont as a precaution against any Macedonian incursion. He apparently remained there through 350 and into 349, since during the war between Macedon and Olynthus in 349, during which Athens attempted to support the Olynthians, he was ordered to bring his forces to the Chalcidice Peninsula to augment those already dispatched under Chares’ command. During this effort, Theopompus, the historian, reported:

For it was notorious that he spent every day in the greatest intemperance, and in such a manner that he was always drinking and getting drunk, and endeavouring to seduce free-born women; and he carried his intemperance to such a height that he ventured to beg a young boy, who was very beautiful and elegant, from the senate of the Olynthians, who had happened to be taken prisoner in the company of Derdas the Macedonian.

Charidemus apparently continued to serve as a general in later years; he was listed in an inscription of 341/0 as serving along with Chares and Phocion on an expedition to collect money from Lesbos to pay for grain purchased from Orontes, location unknown.

After the Battle of Chaeronea (338 BC), in which the forces of Athens and Thebes were soundly beaten by Macedonia, there was a faction in the Athenian Assembly that would have entrusted Charidemus with the command of the army and the task of reengaging the Macedonians, but they were countered by the “better men” who persuaded the body to put the city in Phocion's hands.

=== Exile ===
After Alexander's army destroyed the city of Thebes in 335, the young Macedonian king turned toward Athens. The Athenians did everything they could to placate him, but demurred when he demanded the surrender of several men who had consistently advocated continued war with Macedon. Phocion and Demades were sent to negotiate and Alexander relented, though he did demand the banishment of Charidemus. So the mercenary-turned-citizen fled to Persia and the court of King Darius III, who received him with distinction.

Later, during the King's preparations for the Battle of Issus (333 BC), he overplayed his hand. When asked whether the Persian forces were adequate to defeat those of Alexander, Charidemus replied that the Macedonians would not be impressed with the splendor of the Persian army, that they were hardened warriors and unless the King met them with a force of equal intensity – i.e., one composed of Greeks and Macedonians – he could not prevail. This reply so angered Darius that he ordered Charidemus’ immediate execution – a rash action he soon regretted.

== Sources ==
- Davies, John K. Athenian Propertied Families 600-300 B.C.. Oxford: Clarendon Press, 1971.
- Harding, Philip, ed. The Story of Athens: The fragments of the local chronicles of Attika. New York: Routledge, 2008.
- Kelly, Douglas. "Charidemos's Citizenship: The Problem of IG li^{2} 207." Zeitschrift Für Papyrologie Und Epigraphik 83 (1990): 96-109. www.jstor.org/stable/20187334.
- Parke, H. W. "When Was Charidemus Made an Athenian Citizen?" The Classical Review 42, no. 5/6 (1928): 170-170. www.jstor.org/stable/698723.
