= Sitalces =

5th century BC king of Thracian Odrysia

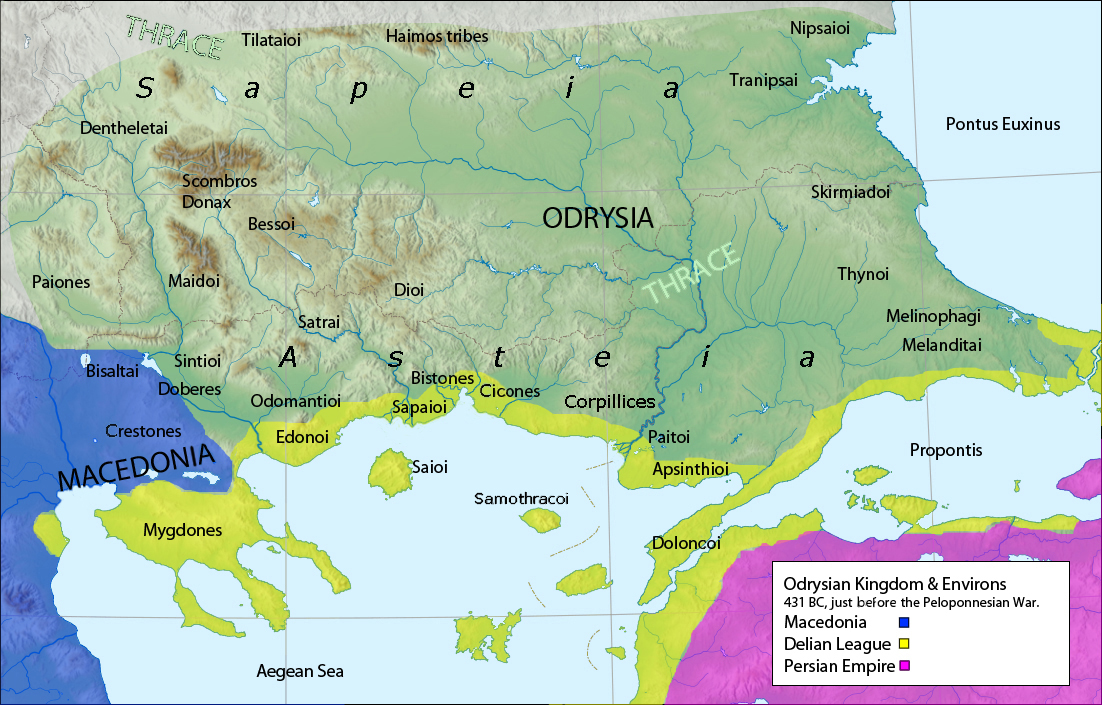
Odrysian kingdom & Environs,431 BC

Sitalces (Sitalkes) (/sɪˈtælˌsiːz/; Ancient Greek: Σιτάλκης; reigned 431–424 BC) was one of the kings of the Thracian Odrysian state. The Suda called him Sitalcus (Σίταλκος).

He was the son of Teres I, and on the sudden death of his father in 431 BC succeeded to the throne. Sitalces enlarged his kingdom by successful wars, and it soon comprised the whole territory from Abdera in the south to the mouths of the Danube in the north, and from the Black Sea in the east to the sources of the Struma in the west.

According to Thucydides, at the commencement of the Peloponnesian War Sitalces entered into alliance with the Athenians, and in 429 BC he invaded Macedon (then ruled by Perdiccas II) with a vast army that included 150,000 warriors from independent Thracian tribes (such as the Dii) and Paeonian tribes (Agrianes, Laeaeans). He was obliged to retire through failure of provisions.

Sitalces was killed in 424 by the Thracian Triballi. He was succeeded on the Odrysian throne by Seuthes I.

Sitalk Peak on Livingston Island in the South Shetland Islands, Antarctica is named for Sitalces.

He had a son named Sadocus (Σάδοκος or Σάδωκος) who became a citizen of Athens.

Sitalces Odrysian kingdom of Thrace Born: Unknown Died: 424 BC
| Preceded by Teres I | King of Thrace; 431–424 BC | Succeeded by Seuthes I |
