= Berisades =

Thracian king (died c. 352 BC)

Berisades (Ancient Greek: Bηρισάδης) was a ruler in Thrace, who inherited, in conjunction with Amadocus II and Cersobleptes, the dominions of the Thracian king Cotys on the death of the latter in 360 BC. Berisades was probably a son of Cotys and a brother of the other two princes.

He may have ruled in conjunction with his son Cetriporis, who entered into an alliance with Athens and the Illyrians against Philip II of Macedonia in 358 BC; Philip defeated the coalition in 353 BC.

== Death ==
Berisades' reign was short, as he was already dead in 352 BC; and on his death Cersobleptes declared war against his children.

== Legacy ==
The Birisades (Bιρισάδης) mentioned by Dinarchus is probably the same as Paerisades, the king of the Bosporan Kingdom, who must not be confounded with the Berisades mentioned above. The Berisades, king of Pontus, whom Stratonicus, the player on the lyre, visited, must also be regarded as the same as Parisades.

== Notes ==
Berisades Odrysian kingdom of Thrace Born: Unknown Died: 352 BC
Preceded by Cotys I	King of Thrace; 358–352 BC	Succeeded by Cetriporis
