= Maisades =

5th-century BC ruler of the Odrysian kingdom

Maisades (Ancient Greek, "Μαισάδης") was a Thracian of the Odrysian kingdom and perhaps the father of Seuthes II. Xenophon in Anabasis (7.2.32) mentions Maisades as the father of Seuthes.

== See also ==
- List of Thracian tribes
- Odrysian kingdom
