= Cersobleptes =

4th-century BC king of the Odrysians in Thrace

- King of Thrace

King of the Odrysians
- Reign: Sep 360 BC-341 BC
- Predecessor: Cotys I
- Successor: Seuthes III (?)
- Issue: Iolaus; Poseidonius; Medistas; Teres
- Father: Cotys I

Cersobleptes (Ancient Greek: Kερσoβλέπτης, romanized: Kersobleptēs, also found in the form Cersebleptes, Kersebleptēs) was the son of Cotys I, king of the Odrysians in Thrace, on whose death in September 360 BC he inherited the throne.

== Early troubles ==
From the beginning of his reign, however, Cersobleptes was beset by problems. He inherited a conflict with the Athenians and with the rebel former royal treasurer Miltokythes from his father, and then there appeared two rivals for the throne, Berisades and Amadocus II. Despite the continued able service of Cersobleptes' brother-in-law, the Euboean adventurer Charidemus, Cersobleptes was forced to make peace with Athens and with his rivals, recognizing them as autonomous rulers of parts of Thrace by 357 BC. The area controlled by Cersobleptes was apparently to the east of the rivers Tonzos and Hebrus, with Amadocus II to his west, and Berisades even farther west, on the border with Macedon.

Charidemus had taken on a prominent role in the contests and negotiations with Athens for the possession of the Thracian Chersonese, with Cersobleptes appearing throughout as a mere puppet of Charidemus. The peninsula seems to have been finally ceded to the Athenians in 357 BC, though they did not occupy it with their settlers until 353 BC; Isocrates is less certain about the earlier date. For some time after the cession of the Chersonese, Cersobleptes continued to court the favor of the Athenians, being perhaps restrained from aggression by the fear of the Athenian fleet based in the Hellespont.

== Allying with Athens against Macedon ==
In 357–356 BC, Philip II of Macedon began to expand at expense of his eastern neighbors, taking advantage of a rebellion among the allies of Athens to seize Amphipolis and Crenides, which he renamed after himself "Philippi", as well as the gold mines of Mount Pangaeum. Some of this expansion was at the expense of Berisades, who died about the same time, and was succeeded by his sons, Cetriporis and his brothers. Cersobleptes and Charidemus conceived the idea of depriving the sons of Berisades of their inheritance, and of obtaining possession of all the former dominions of Cotys. With this objective in mind, Charidemus gained from the Athenian people, through his party among the orators, a decree in his favor. In response to this outcome, Demosthenes delivered a speech (which still exists) through which he unsuccessfully tried to impeach the mover of the decree, Aristocrates. But before the scheme of Cersobleptes and Charidemus could succeed, Cetriporis provoked the ire of Philip II of Macedon by joining the kings of Paeonia and Illyria against him, leading to Philip's victory over the allies and the expansion of Macedonian influence in this part of Thrace.

From a passing reference in Demosthenes' oration, it appears that by 354 or 353 BC Philip II was at Maroneia, negotiating with Cersobleptes' envoy Apollonides, apparently planning for a joint attack against Amadocus II and the Athenian holdings in the Chersonese; the Theban general Pammenes was also involved. However, the plans failed, and Cersobleptes allied with Athens in exchange for Athens removing its protection from Amadocus II. Athens began to plant cleruchies in the Chersonese, while Cersobleptes attacked both Amadocus II to his west and the Greek cities of Perinthus and Byzantium to his east. Provoked by Cersobleptes' alliance with Athens, Philip II now invaded Cersobleptes' kingdom as an ally of Perinthus and Byzantium in 352 BC. Cersobleptes was defeated and had to send one of his sons as hostage to Philip's court at Pella. Philip appears to have annexed the lands of the sons of Berisades, who may have been the Thracian brothers who are said to have invited him to settle their disputes; Amadocus II disappears as well, perhaps deposed by either Philip II or Cersobleptes, and at any rate succeeded by Teres III.

== Macedonian conquest and probable death ==
After an apparent lull in hostilities, in 347–346 BC Cersobleptes appears to have sought Athenian support again, and Athens installed additional garrisons in the coastal cities of Thrace, perhaps provoking a Macedonian campaign under Philip's general Antipater. When Athens attempted to include Cersobleptes in a peace with Philip II in 346 BC, the proposal was rebuffed, and Philip proceeded to campaign in Thrace, expelling Athenian garrisons from the coastal towns. Several years later, in 342–340 BC, Philip II led a more substantial campaign into Thrace. By early 341 he had overrun the coast, passed through Cardia, Aenus and taken Cabyle. The remainder of the campaign brought Philip into the lands beyond Mount Haemus and into conflict with the Getae and contact with the Scythians. Sometime in this period, in unknown circumstances, the Thracian kings Teres III and Cersobleptes had been eliminated or subjugated, and the towns of Philippopolis and Cabyle were established as Macedonian colonies. By 340 BC, Philip II was laying siege to Perinthus and Byzantium.

== Sons and succession ==
According to an inscription from Delphi (FD III.1 392), dated to 355 BC, Cersobleptes had four sons, named Iolaus, Poseidonius, Medistas, and Teres. It is unclear whether any of them inherited any sort of authority from their father. The next significant Odrysian king in Thrace was Seuthes III, sometimes identified (hypothetically) as a son or brother of Cersobleptes, or with a Seuthes known to have served as Cersobleptes' deputy (hyparkhos).

== Notes ==
Cersobleptes Odrysian kingdom of Thrace Born: Unknown Died: Unknown
Preceded by Cotys I	King of Thrace; 360–341 BC	Succeeded by ? Seuthes III
