= Caeni =

Thracian tribe

Kainoi (Greek: Καινοί) or Caeni is the name of a Thracian tribe, mentioned by the Roman historian Livy.

== See also ==
- List of Thracian tribes
