= Amadocus II =

4th-century BC Thracian king

Amadocus (Ancient Greek: Ἀμάδoκoς, romanized: Amadokos, also Amatokos) was an Odrysian ruler in Thrace, who ruled from 360 to c. 351 BC.

Amadocus II was the son of Amadocus I (Medocus), according to a fragment of Theopompus, which specifies that there were two kings named Amadocus, father and son, of whom the son was a contemporary of Philip II of Macedon. It is unclear when Amadocus II first laid claim to the throne, and numismatic evidence for an Amadocus as a rival to Cotys I in the late 380s or early 370s BC may refer to him rather than to his father. Soon after the murder of Cotys I in September 360 BC, his son and successor Cersobleptes was faced with several opponents, including Amadocus II and Berisades. While he eliminated some other rivals, by 357 BC Cersobleptes was forced to agree to a partitioning of the kingdom with Amadocus II and Berisades, who had secured Athenian support: Cersobleptes kept eastern Thrace, Amadocus II central Thrace, and Berisades western Thrace. The area under Amadocus II's control is generally identified as laying west of the river Hebrus and north of Maroneia. It is likely that the fortified residence of a Thracian ruler on Kozi Gramadi Peak above the village of Starosel belonged to him. In 354 or 353 BC, Cersobleptes and Philip planned joint action against Amadocus and the Athenians. When this plan failed, Cersobleptes made an alliance with the Athenians, luring them away from their arrangement with Amadocus, and attacked Amadocus by himself. Now Philip intervened, attacking and defeating Cersobleptes in 352 BC. About this time Amadocus disappears from the sources. He was succeeded by Teres III, who was probably his son.

== Notes ==
Amadocus II Odrysian kingdom of Thrace Born: Unknown Died: Unknown
| Preceded by Cotys I | King of Thrace; 360–351 | Succeeded by Teres III |
