= Iphicrates =

Famous 4th century BCE Athenian general and mercenary commander

- Native name: Ιφικράτης
- Born: c. 418 BC
- Died: c. 353 BC (aged c. 65)
- Allegiance: Athens
- Service years: 391 - 378 BC
- Conflicts: Corinthian War (Battle of Lechaeum); Social War (357–355 BC)
- Children: Menestheus and 1 other son

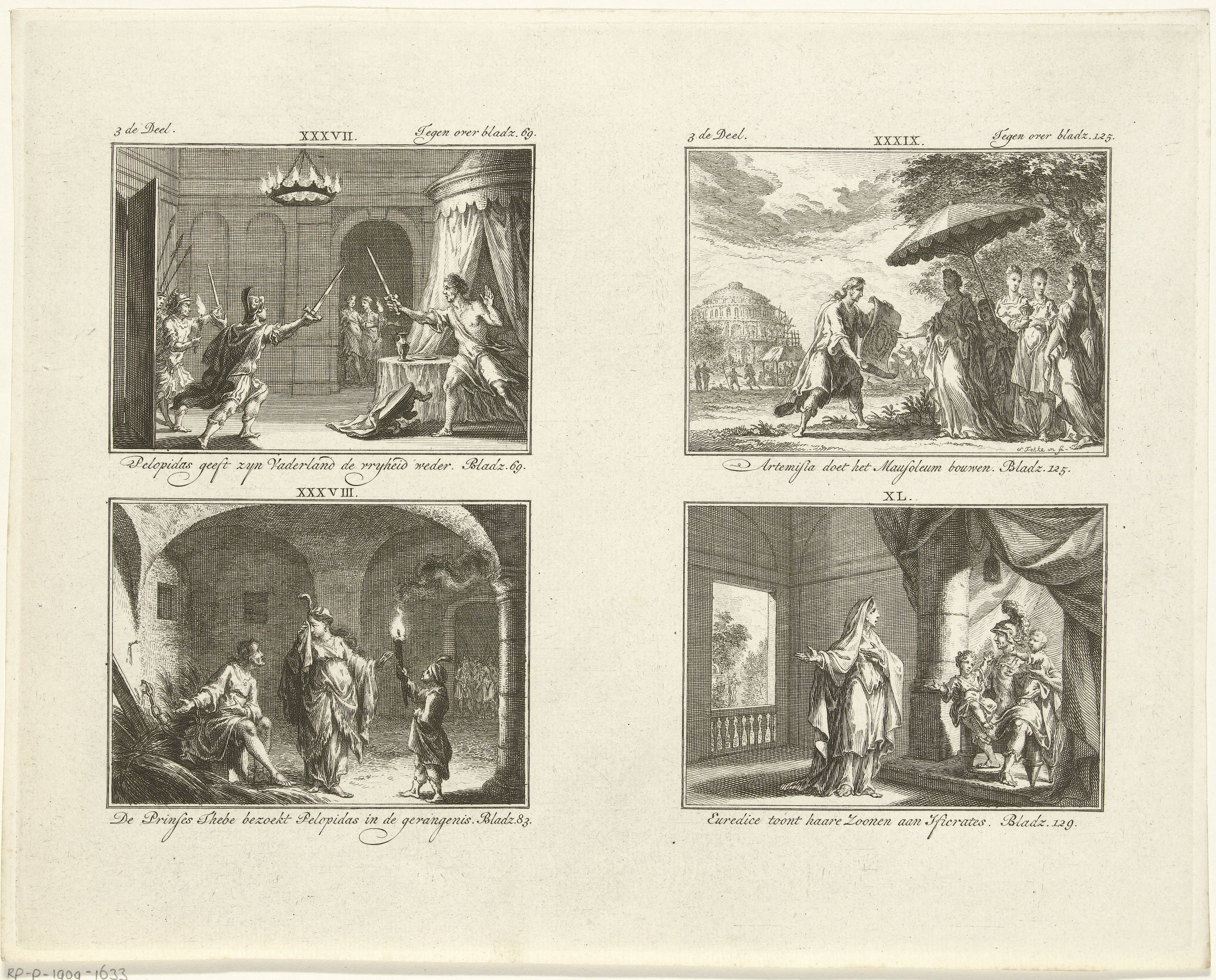
Imaginary drawing of Iphicrates

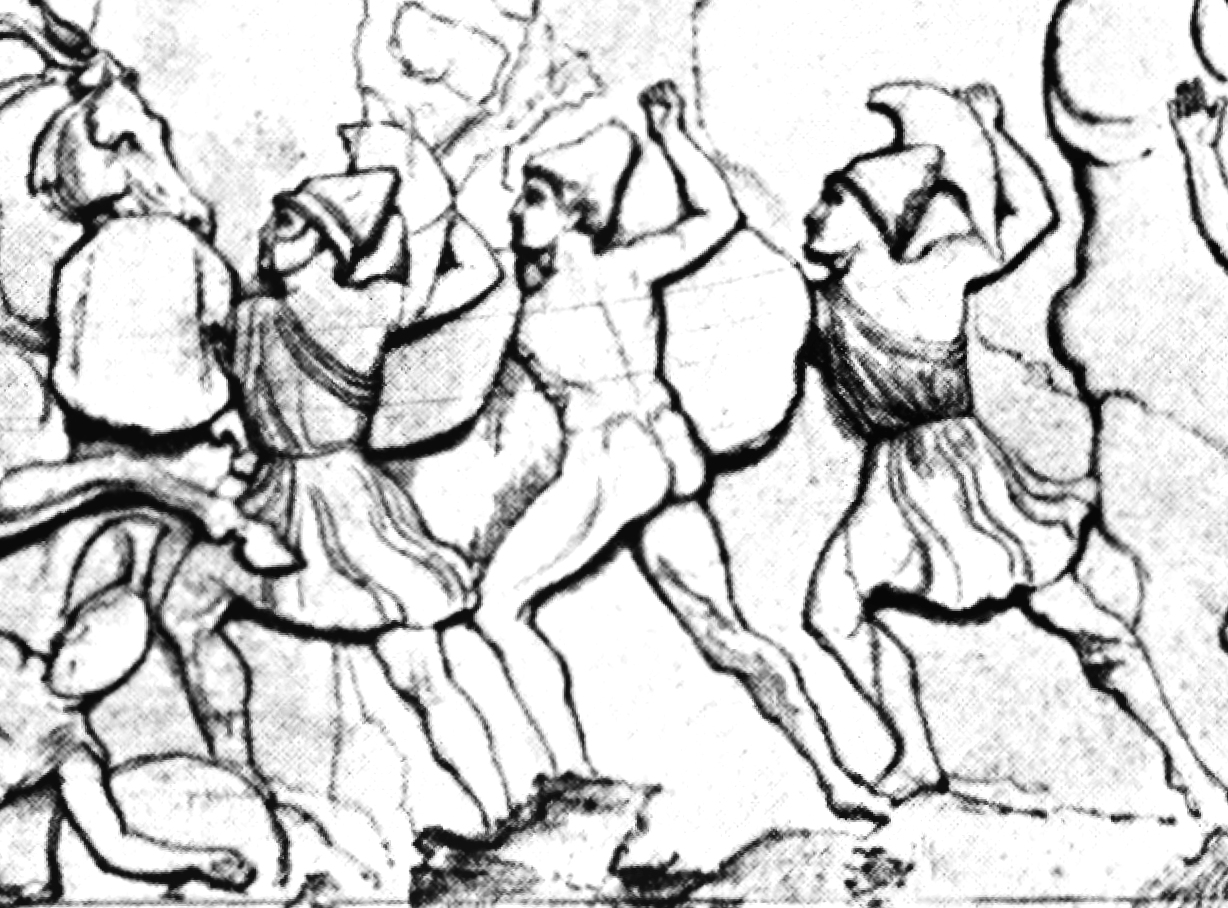
Peltasts on the Tomb of Payava (circa 360 BC), around the time of Iphicrates. They are equipped with the exomis, the pilos with crest and cheekpiece, and the round pelte shield, and are depicted thrusting overarm with a long spear.

Iphicrates (Ancient Greek: Ιφικράτης) (c. 418 – c. 353 BC) was an Athenian general, who flourished in the earlier half of the 4th century BC. He is credited with important infantry reforms that revolutionized ancient Greek warfare by regularizing light-armed peltasts.

Cornelius Nepos wrote that Iphicrates was such a leader, that he was not only comparable to the first commanders of his own time, but no one even of the older generals could be set above him. He had a deep knowledge of military tactics, he often had the command of armies and he never miscarried in an undertaking by his own fault. He was always eminent for invention and excellence that he not only introduced much that was new into the military art, but made many improvements in what existed before.

== Biography ==
The son of a shoemaker of the deme of Rhamnous, he was later married to the daughter of the Thracian King Cotys I and had a son with her. His son was named Menestheus (Μενεσθεύς), after the legendary King of Athens during the Trojan War. Iphicrates's other son, who was also called Iphicrates, was sent as the Athenian ambassador to the Persian court sometime before 335 BC. He was captured by Alexander the Great along with the Persian court and other Greek ambassadors in the aftermath of the Battle of Issus. Alexander treated him with special honour, both from friendship to the city of Athens and from recollection of his father's glory; when he died from an unknown disease Alexander paid for the transportation of his body to his homeland.

When Eurydice I of Macedon asked Iphicrates (the elder) to protect her sons after the death of Amyntas III of Macedon, he took them under his protection.

Plutarch wrote that Iphicrates thought that the mercenary soldier might well be fond of wealth and fond of pleasure, in order that his quest for the means to gratify his desires might lead him to fight with greater recklessness.

== Iphicratean reforms ==
He owes his fame as much to the improvements he made in the equipment of the peltasts or light-armed mercenaries (named for their small pelte shield) as to his military successes. Historians have debated about just what kind of "peltasts" were affected by his reforms; one of the most popular positions is that he improved the performance of the Greek skirmishers so that they would be able to engage in prolonged hand-to-hand fighting as part of the main battle line, while another strong opinion posits that he worked his changes upon the mercenary hoplites that were an important factor in late 5th and early 4th century BC Greek land warfare. A third possibility is that his reforms were limited to hoplites serving as marines on board ships of the Athenian navy.

Traditional Greek infantry soldiers used very large shields, short spears and small swords; Iphicrates introduced the smaller and lighter pelte shields, which helped them be more active in movements and encounters, doubled the length of the spears and made the swords longer. In place of bronze cuirasses he promoted use of the linen linothorax, which offered protection equivalent to metal armour at a greatly lessened weight. He also made lightweight soldiers' boots that were easy to untie. These boots were afterwards called Iphicratides (Greek: Ἰφικρατίδες). The longer weapons, combined with the lighter armor and shield, helped his troops to move rapidly and take a more aggressive approach in tactical situations.

== Wars ==
=== Corinthian War against Sparta ===
When Iphicrates invaded the territory of Phlius, the men from the city came out against him in an unguarded way, but Iphicrates had set an ambush and his troops killed many of them.

Iphicrates and his troops invaded many districts of Arcadia, plundering unprotected areas and even attacking walled towns. The hoplites of the Arcadians stayed within their walls rather than face Iphicrates's famous peltasts.

With his troops, Iphicrates dealt the Spartans a heavy blow in 392/390 BC by almost annihilating a mora (a battalion of about 600 men) of their famous hoplites at the Battle of Lechaeum near Corinth. Following up success, he took city after city for the Athenians during the Corinthian War; but in consequence of a quarrel with the Argives he was transferred from Corinth to the Hellespont, where he was equally successful.

=== Thrace and Egypt ===
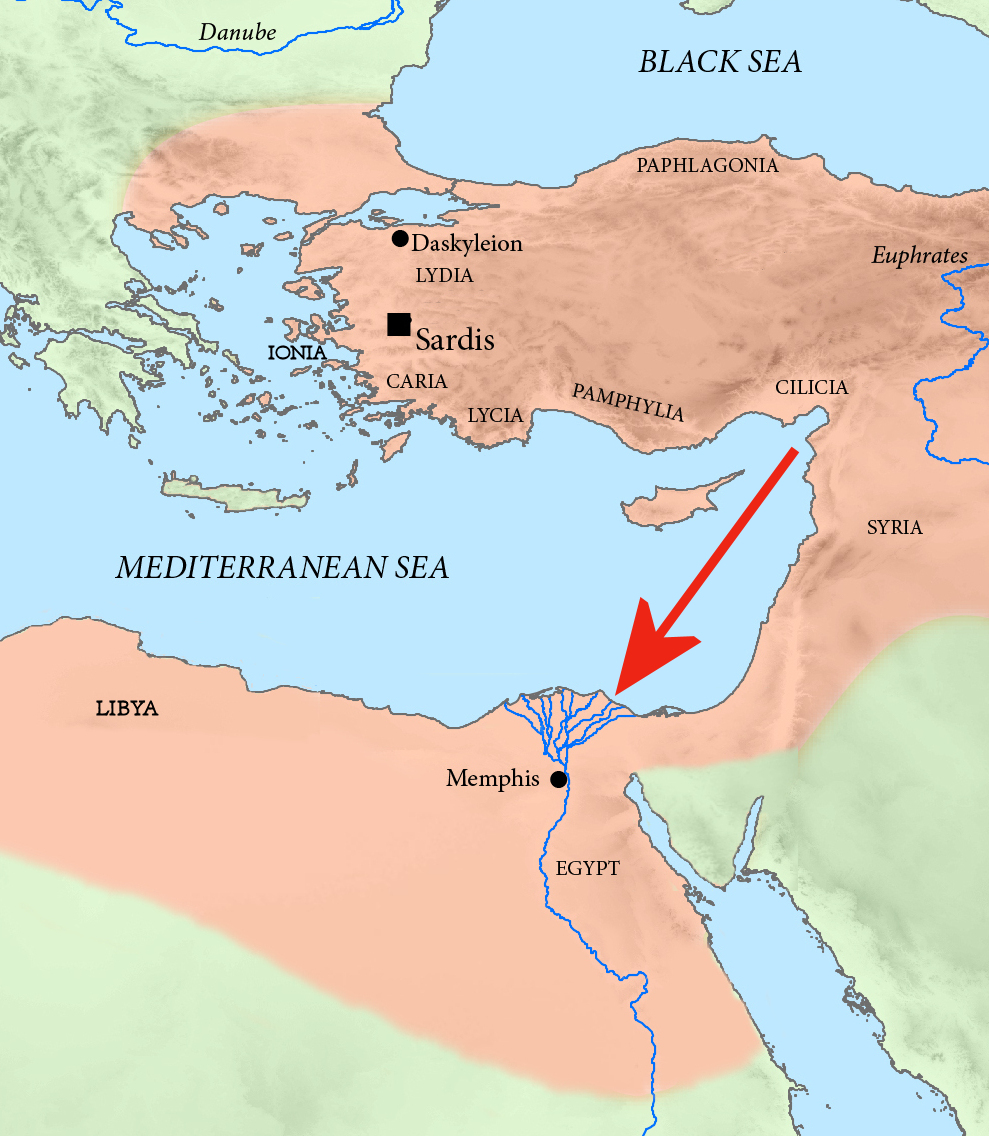
Iphicrates took part at the Achaemenid campaign of Pharnabazus II against Egypt in 373 BC.

After the Peace of Antalcidas (387 BC) he assisted Seuthes, king of Thracian Odrysae, who was an ally of the Athenians, to recover his kingdom, and fought against Cotys, with whom, however, he subsequently concluded an alliance.

Around 378 BC, he was sent with a force of mercenaries to assist the Persians to reconquer Egypt, but a dispute with Pharnabazus II led to the failure of the expedition.

On his return to Athens he commanded an expedition in 373 BC for the relief of Corcyra, which was besieged by the Lacedaemonians.

After the peace of 371 BC, Iphicrates returned to Thrace and somewhat tarnished his fame by siding with his father-in-law Cotys I in a war against Athens for the possession of the entire Thracian Chersonese. Iphicrates, however, refused to besiege the Athenian strongholds and fled to Antissa.

=== Social War ===
The Athenians soon pardoned him and gave him a joint command in the Social War against some of their allies from the second Athenian Empire. He and two of his colleagues were impeached by Chares, the fourth commander, because they had refused to give battle during a violent storm.

Iphicrates was acquitted but sentenced to pay a heavy fine. Afterwards, he remained at Athens until his death around 353 BC (although according to some he retired to Thrace).

== Legacy ==
Iphicrates was a strict commander who paid special attention to drill and maneuver. Cornelius Nepos mentions that no troops in Greece were ever better disciplined or more obedient to the orders of their leader than those of Iphicrates.

The Iphicratean reforms are considered to have been one of the leading influences on Philip II of Macedon, when he created the sarissa-armed Macedonian phalanx. His son, Alexander the Great, used this new infantry formation in his many conquests.

== Sources ==
- Habicht, Christian (1998). Ελληνιστική Αθήνα [Hellenistic Athens] (in Greek). Athens: Odysseas. ISBN 960-210-310-8.
