= Seuthes V =

Odysrian king

Seuthes V (Ancient Greek: Σεύθης, Seuthēs) was a king of the Odrysians in Thrace in the late 3rd or early 2nd century BC. He is only known as the father of Cotys IV, who is attested between 171 and 166 BC as an ally first of Antigonid Macedon, then of Rome. The Roman historian Livy specifically describes Cotys and his father Seuthes as Odrysians. Livy's statement that in its diplomatic interaction with Cotys IV the Roman Senate referenced a traditional friendship with Cotys and his ancestors can be interpreted as evidence for contact between Rome and Seuthes V. Seuthes V is believed to have reigned around the year 200 BC as a predecessor or rival of Amadocus III, who was captured by the Macedonians in 184 BC. The chronology and names suggest that he may have been a son of Roigos and grandson of Seuthes IV or a son of Teres IV and grandson of Seuthes IV, depending on the chronological placement of Roigos in the middle or beginning of the 3rd century BC.

== See also ==
- List of rulers of Thrace and Dacia
