= Cotys IV =

2nd-century BCE king of the Odrysians

Cotys IV (Ancient Greek: Κότυς, Kotys) was a king of the Odrysians in Thrace from before 171 until after 166 BC. He was the son of Seuthes V and succeeded either his father or another king, Amadocus III, who was captured by the Macedonians in 184 BC (it is unclear whether Amadocus III and Cotys IV ruled the same political formation and whether kingship was unitary). While the survival of a specifically Odrysian state past the mid-3rd century has been doubted, Cotys IV is described as an Odrysian by Polybius and Livy, although the term may have been used in a less than specific sense.

During the Third Macedonian War (171-168 BC), Cotys IV was initially an ally of the Macedonian king Perseus, sending a force of a thousand cavalry and a thousand infantry to his ally, which contributed to the initial Macedonian victory over the Romans at Callinicus in 171 BC. However, following an attack on Cotys' kingdom by another Thracian ruler, Autlesbis (of the Caeni?), and the Attalid commander Corrhagus, allies of Rome, Cotys and his force were allowed to return to defend their homelands by Perseus, who gave them half of the promised pay. Nevertheless, Cotys IV was able to assist Perseus again at the Battle of Pydna in 168 BC, although the allies were defeated by the Romans, and Cotys and his forces followed Perseus in his flight from the battlefield. When Perseus embarked for Samothrace, the Thracians, possibly including those of Cotys, refused to follow and returned to their homes. Later Perseus planned to flee from Samothrace to Cotys, but had to surrender to the Romans. Cotys' son Bithys (the same name is usually spelled Beithys in Thracian inscriptions) had been left a hostage at Perseus' court and ended up among the Macedonian royal captives of the Romans at Carseoli. Cotys sent envoys to the Roman senate to ransom his son, claiming he had been forced to support Perseus. The Roman senate pardoned his actions and released his son without taking the ransom. The grateful Cotys now became a Roman ally. The lenient treatment of Cotys IV by the Roman government in 167 BC is attributed to its desire to secure a useful ally in the region, given both past experience and potential current threats. A decree from Abdera usually dated to c. 166 BC shows Cotys, apparently bolstered by this new alliance with Rome, expanding his territory and encroaching upon Abdera's. This is generally considered to be the last mention of Cotys IV in the source material, but doubts have been raised regarding the date of the Abdera decree and whether anyone but a Sapaean Cotys could have encroached upon Abdera. It is not known when Cotys IV ceased to reign or who succeeded him: his son Bithys is not securely attested as ruler, unless perhaps mentioned under the orthography "Byzes" in c. 146 BC; a certain Teres (V or VI) is attested as reigning in 148 BC, but he may have belonged to a different branch of the dynasty or to a different Thracian kingdom. The name "Cotys" appears among both the so-called Odryso-Astaean and Sapaean kings of Thrace, which may indicate descent from Cotys IV (particularly for the former), but there is no absolute proof for such a link.

Polybius and Diodorus eulogize Cotys, describing him as a man of striking appearance and martial qualities, worthy of friendship, sober and polite, unlike other Thracians.

According to a creative and eclectic reconstruction of the pedigree of Thracian rulers that has gained uncritical acceptance in many "descents from Antiquity" personal genealogy projects online, Cotys IV married Semestra and had a son, Dyegilos, who married Apama, daughter of Prusias II of Bithynia and his wife Apama III. Their son Sothimus married Athenais, daughter of Attalus III of Pergamon and wife Berenice, and their son was Cotys I of the Sapaeans. Of these, Diegylis (c. 145 BC) is attested as king of the Caeni, while Sothimus (c. 88 BC) is usually identified as a king of the Maedi.

== See also ==
- List of Thracian tribes
- List of rulers of Thrace and Dacia
