= Odrysian kingdom =

Union of Thracian tribes and kingdoms (5th century BC to 3rd century BC)

Coordinates: 41.9800°N 25.7100°E

- c. 480 BC–c. 30 BC
- Labrys (Note: "In Hellenistic Thrace, the double axe was an attribute of Zalmoxis, the god of thunder. It is also depicted on coins of Thrace as the symbol of the kings of the Odrysae, who considered Zalmoxis the ancestor and protector of the royal house.")

- The Odrysian kingdom under king Sitalces (c. 431–424)
- Capital: Seuthopolis (c. 330–250 BC)
- Common languages: Thracian; Greek (used in writing and among trade and administration)
- Religion: Thracian polytheism
- Government: Monarchy
- Historical era: Classical antiquity
  - Foundation: c. 480 BC
  - Conquest by Philip II of Macedon: 340 BC
  - Rebellion of Seuthes III: c. 330
  - Destruction of Seuthopolis: c. 250
  - Conquest of Odrysian heartlands by the Sapaeans: c. 30 BC

Area
  - Total: 160,000 km^{2} (62,000 sq mi)
Preceded by
Prehistoric Balkans
Skudra (Achaemenid Empire)
Succeeded by
Kingdom of Macedon
Getae
Tylis
Sapaean kingdom
- Today part of: Bulgaria; Greece; Turkey; Romania

The Odrysian kingdom (/oʊˈdrɪʒən/; Ancient Greek: Βασίλειον Ὀδρυσῶν) was an ancient Thracian state that thrived between the early 5th century BC and the early 3rd / late 1st century BC. Located in present-day Bulgaria, southeastern Romania (Northern Dobruja), northern Greece and European Turkey, it was a tribal amalgam dominated by the Odrysians that was the first large political entity to develop in the eastern Balkans. Before the foundation of Seuthopolis in the late 4th century it had no fixed capital.

The Odrysian kingdom was founded by king Teres I, exploiting the collapse of the Persian presence in Europe due to failed invasion of Greece in 480–79. Teres and his son Sitalces pursued a policy of expansion, making the kingdom one of the most powerful of its time. Throughout much of its early history it remained an ally of Athens and even joined the Peloponnesian War on its side. By 400 BC the state showed the first signs of fatigue, although the skilled Cotys I initiated a brief renaissance that lasted until his murder in 360 BC.

Afterwards the kingdom disintegrated: southern and central Thrace were divided among three Odrysian kings, while the northeast came under the dominion of the kingdom of the Getae. The three Odrysian kingdoms were eventually conquered by the rising kingdom of Macedon under Philip II in 340 BC. A much smaller Odrysian state was revived in around 330 BC by Seuthes III, who founded a new capital named Seuthopolis that functioned until the second quarter of the 3rd century BC. After that there is little conclusive evidence for the persistence of an Odrysian state, with the exception of a dubious Odrysian king fighting in the Third Macedonian War named Cotys. The Odrysian kingdom was attacked by the Roman Republic in the late 1st century BC, when the Odrysian heartlands eventually became known as the Sapaean kingdom, a client state of the Roman Republic, which was finally abolished and converted into a Roman province of Thracia in 45-46 AD.

== History ==
=== Background ===
==== Thrace and its early history ====
Since the ancient Thracians lacked an indigenous writing tradition, the most important sources for the reconstruction of their history are archaeological remains, coins as well as accounts of ancient Greek historians. Said historians considered the Thracians to be a numerous people and their country, Thrace, to be of barely comprehensible size, so large that Andron of Halicarnassus (4th century BC) thought of it as a continent of its own. While the boundaries of Thrace fluctuated throughout history, Thrace can be divided in a northern and a southern half, which were also culturally different. The border between the two halves has been identified as the Haemus Mountains or the Danube slightly further north. Southern Thrace covered the fertile valley between the Haemus and the Rhodopes, the Strandzha and the shores of the Propontis and the Aegean and Black Seas. The western boundary was marked by the Strymon and the upper Morava. Northern Thrace was defined by the Danube, the Carpathians and the adjacent western tip of the Pontic–Caspian steppe, thus enclosing parts of the territory now comprising modern Romania, Moldova, Serbia and Ukraine. Thrace also extended into what is now northwestern Turkey both west and east (Bithynia, Mysia) of the Propontis.

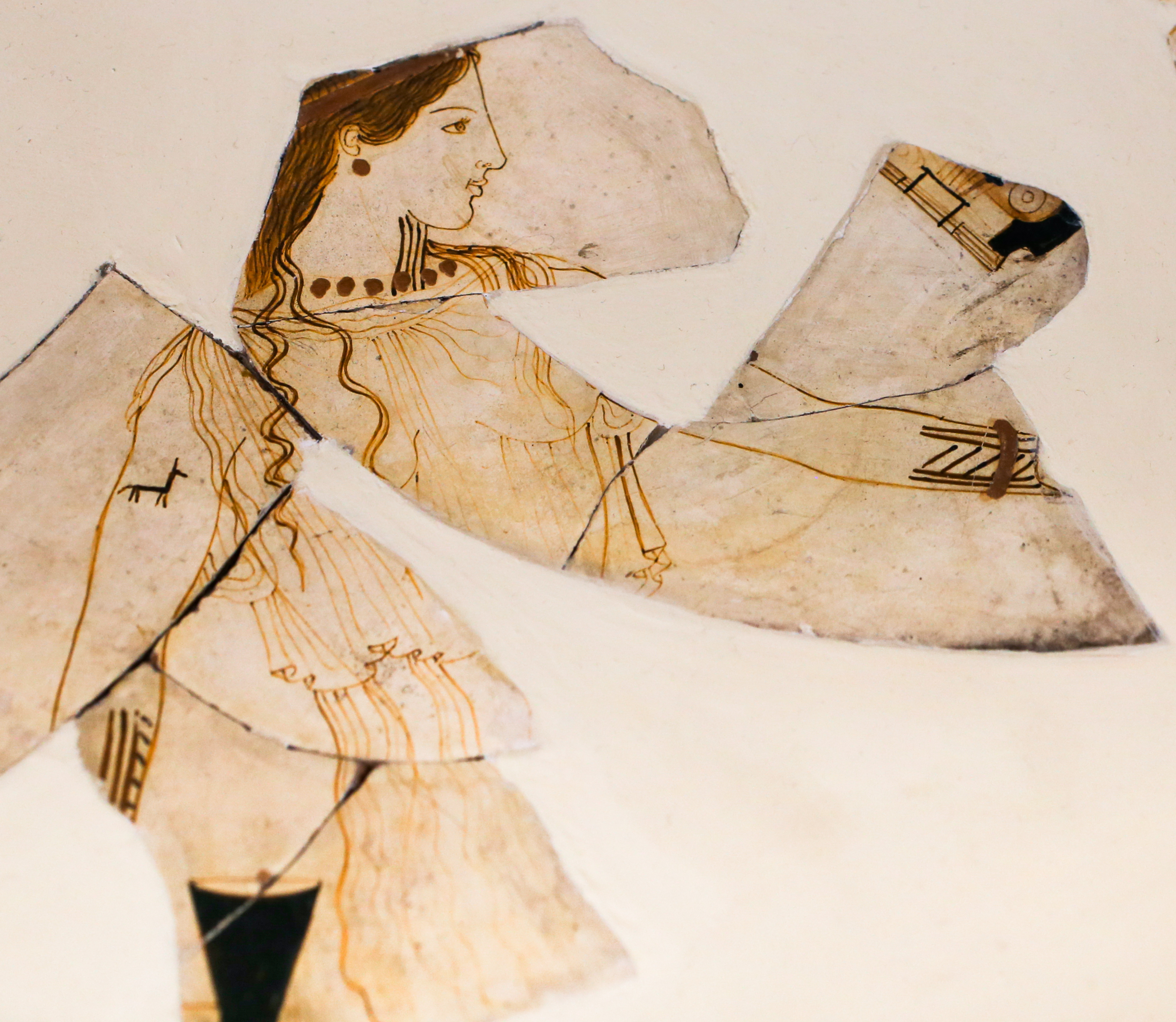
Greek vase painting showing a Thracian woman with tattooed arms, c. 470 BC

Thracians had already settled in the 2nd millennium BCE, and were featured in the epics of Homer. Occasional references to them appear in the following centuries, although it was not until the 5th century when Greek literature developed an interest in discussing non-Greeks more extensively. In the 7th and 6th centuries, much of the Thracian coast was settled by Greek colonists who founded numerous towns, like Thasos, Byzantion or Odessos. The political history of the Thracian tribes of this age is virtually unknown, although it is recorded that in the late 6th century, Athenian settlers interacted with a "king of Thrace" (and possible predecessor of the Odrysian kings?) residing north of the Chersonese peninsula. The absence of imported artefacts confirms that inland Thrace north of the Rhodopes remained largely isolated from the Aegean trade until the late 6th century.

==== Persian Thrace ====
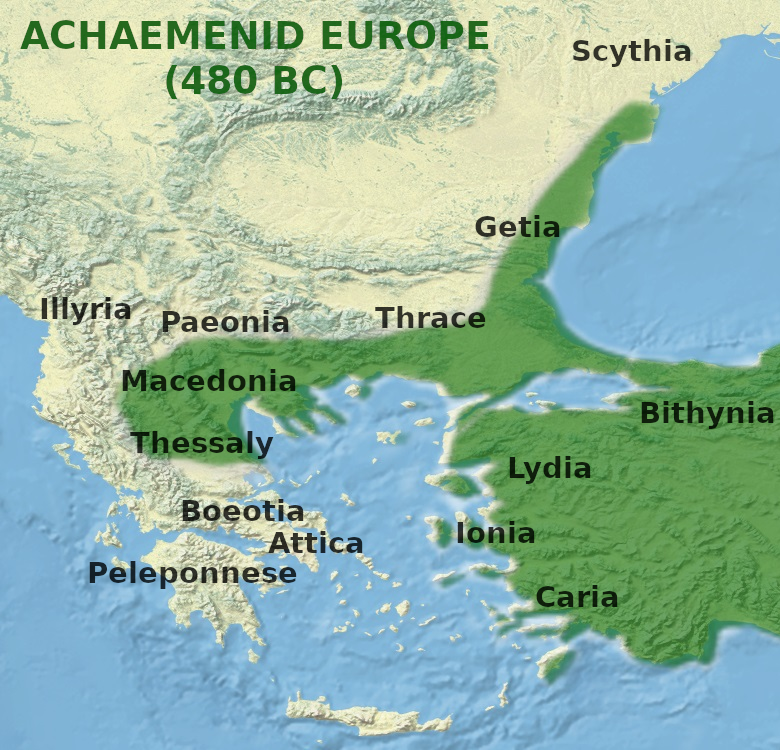
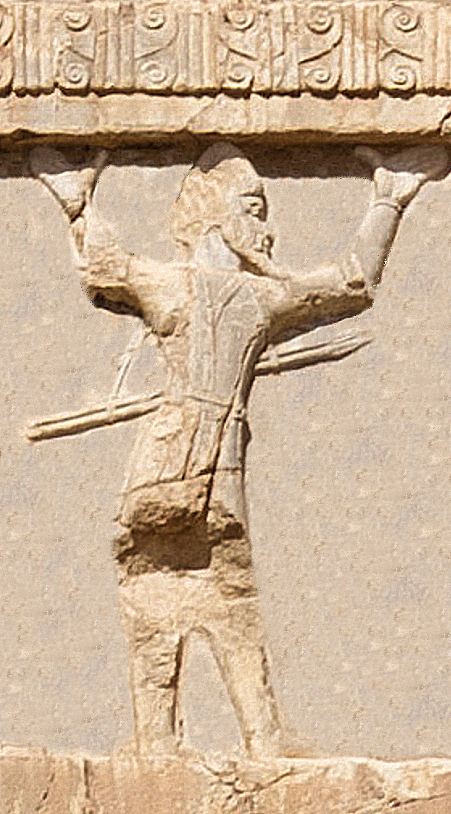
Left: Southeastern Thrace as part of the Achaemenid zone of influence in 480 BC. Right: A Persian frieze from the royal tomb of Naqsh-e Rostam showing a man from "Skudra", c. 480 BC. "Skudra" is traditionally identified with Thrace, although this is not undisputed.

In around 513 BC, an army of the mighty Persian dynasty of the Achaemenids crossed the Bosphorus, after already having subdued the Thracians of Bithynia thirty years earlier. King Darius I's goal was a punitive expedition against the Scythians at the northern shores of the Black Sea. Most eastern Thracian tribes submitted peacefully, except of the Getae, who were defeated. More expeditions under the generals Megabazus and Mardonius as well as king Xerxes I followed, even though they only managed to secure the Aegean coast.

It seems most likely that the Achaemenids did not establish a satrapy (provincial administration) in Thrace, even though the historian Herodotus claimed that the subdued regions had to pay taxes. As a matter of fact, there is no evidence for important administrative centers. Instead, Persian authority was merely exercised through a couple of garrisoned forts, most importantly those of Doriskos and Eion. Hence, the vast majority of Thrace remained unaffected by the Persian presence. After the failed invasion of Greece in 480-79, the Persian foothold in Europe collapsed. By around 450, Persian authority in Europe, including Thrace, had vanished entirely.

=== Foundation and early years (c. 480–431 BC) ===
==== Early tribal kingdom ====
Although the Persian presence in Thrace was short-lived, it probably stimulated trade and first state formations among the Thracians. Mintings of Thracian coins started around 500 and may be an indicator for a variety of early tribal kingdoms. It has been suggested that the Odrysian kingdom might have had its origins in this period, even though the name of the Odrysians is notably absent from the numismatic evidence. The Odrysians eventually stepped into the light of history in the aftermath of the Persian failure in Greece, when they were mentioned by Herodotus, but without any further details. The Odrysians had their core territory in the valleys of the Hebros river and its tributaries Tonzos and Arda. Like other Thracian polities, the Odrysian tribal kingdom attempted to fill the vacuum left by the Persian retreat.

==== Expansion under Teres I ====
The first known Odrysian king was the expansionist Teres I, who is claimed by Thucydides to have been the first Odrysian king altogether. Writing in the late 5th century BC, he wrote that Teres "was the first powerful king of the Odrysae" and that he "was the first founder of the great Odrysian empire, which he extended over a large part of Thrace, although many of the Thracian tribes are still independent." Said independent tribes consisted of Thracians living along parts of the Aegean coast and in parts of the Rhodope mountains and as well as the powerful Triballi around the Haemus.

Teres most likely came to dominate central Thrace soon after 480 BC. Building his realm on a privileged warrior aristocracy, he and his son Sitalces expanded the realm from the Danube in the north to the outskirts of Abdera at the Aegean Sea. He also expanded to eastern Thrace, although he suffered a setback at the hands of the Thynoi. In the north-east, he cemented the position of his realm by allying himself with the kingdom of Scythia under king Ariapeithes, who married Teres' daughter. In conclusion, the Odrysians were the first to supersede the Thracian tribal system and establish a large state in the eastern Balkans.

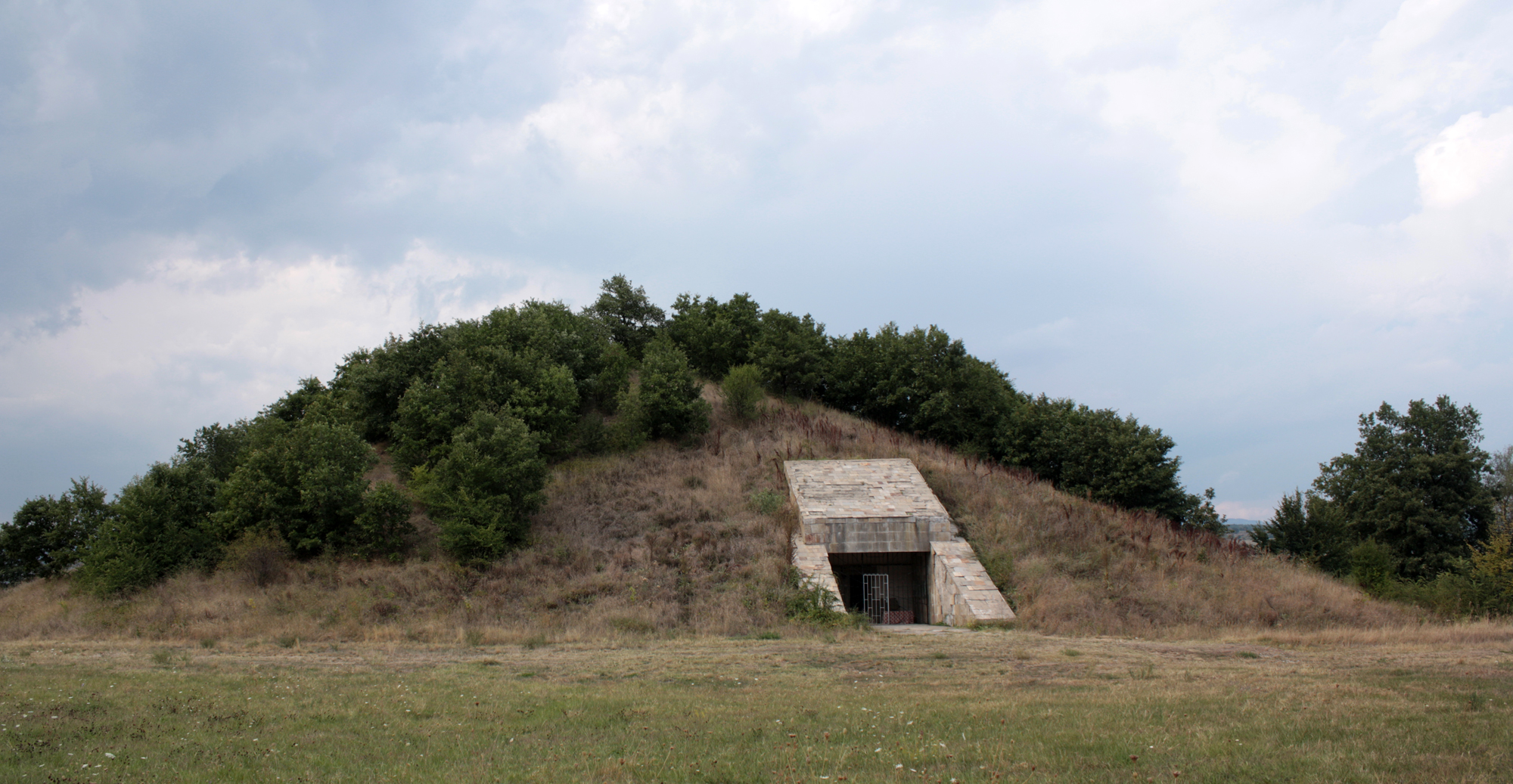
A typical Odrysian elite tomb: the Zhaba Mogila tumulus near Strelcha, 5th–4th centuries BC

Around the middle of the 5th century, when Sitalces had not yet succeeded his father, the Odrysians intervened in a Scythian civil war, seemingly on the side of the dethroned king Scylas against Octamasadas, who was a son of Ariapeithes and Teres' sister. When the two armies met at the Danube, however, Sitalces simply agreed to hand over Scylas (who was killed on the spot) for an unnamed brother of his who resided among the Scythians. Another important event may have happened further east, in the Bosporan Kingdom, when a Thracian named Spartokos seized power in around 438. It is not unlikely that he was of Odrysian descent and that his takeover was instigated by the Odrysian royal house, although this must remain speculation.

==== The early Odrysian elite in archaeology ====
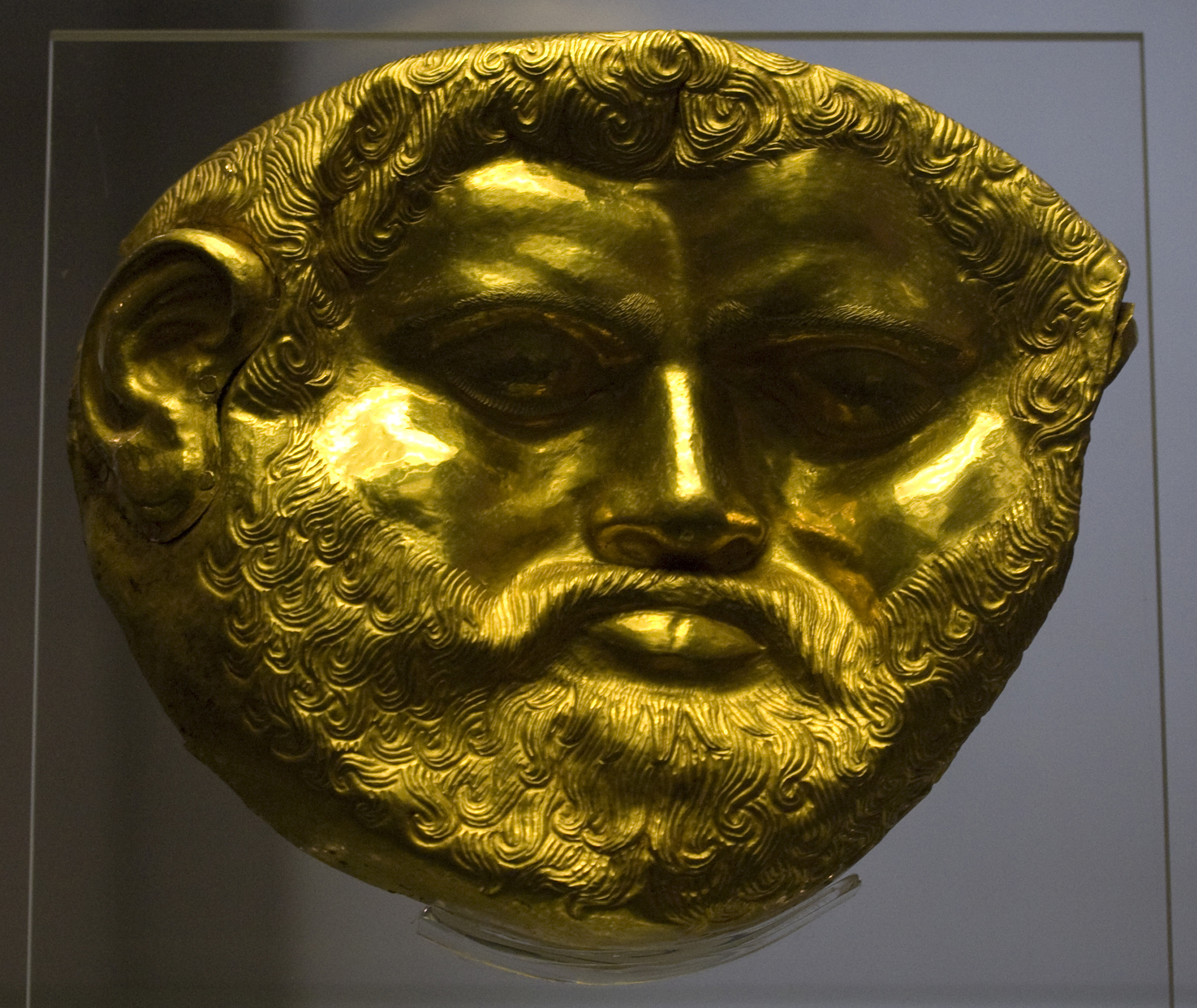
Gold funeral mask from the Svetitsa tumulus near Shipka, second half of the 5th century BC

Archaeological evidence confirms that by the middle of the 5th century BC, a new and powerful elite had emerged that accumulated a wealth of precious artifacts of both local and regional origin. Burial practices were changing after the Persian withdrawal and a new type of elite burial emerged in central Thrace in the form of tombs with ashlar masonry, sometimes with stone sarcophagi. The tomb of Rouets from the late 5th century even contained traces of wall paintings. The earliest of these new elite tombs can be found in the necropolis of Duvanli, with the oldest tombs dating to the mid-5th century. Their inventory is exceptional not only by contemporary Thracian, but even Mediterranean standards. According to the archaeologist Tonkova they contained "splendid sets of head and body ornaments, consisting of numerous hoop or boat-shaped earrings, pendants for earrings, a necklace, a torque, bracelets, finger-rings, chains with pendants and fibulae, and pectorals." Most Thracian elite tombs have been identified as warrior burials as they contained weapons and gold pectorals. Two burials from Svetitsa (second half of the 5th century BC) and Dalakova (early 4th century BC) also contained finely crafted and rather impressive gold funeral masks.

=== The Odrysians and the Peloponnesian War (431–404 BC) ===
==== Sitalces and his alliance with Athens ====
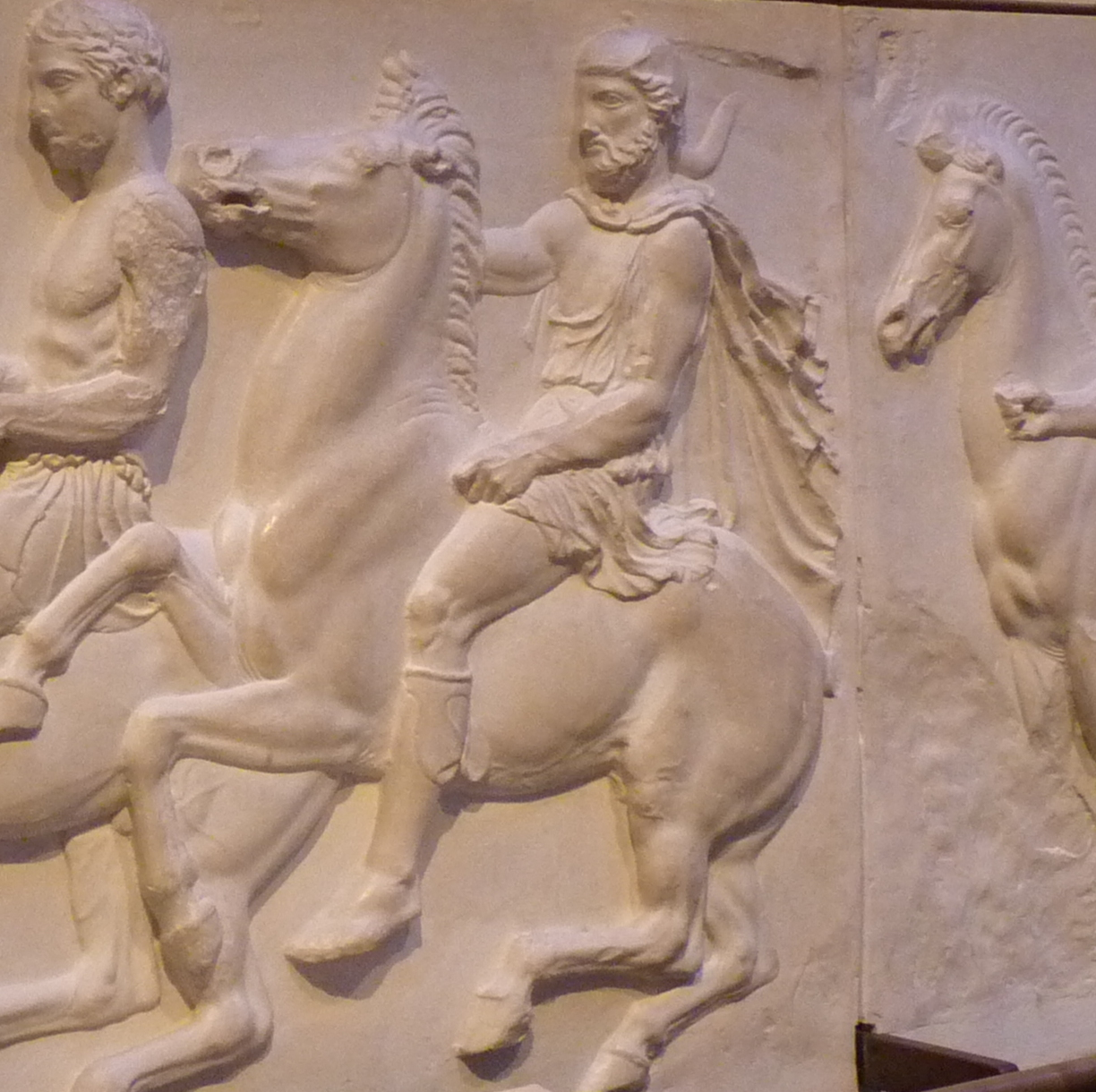
A frieze from the Parthenon of Athens showing an Athenian hippeus wearing Thracian boots, a cloak and a fox-skin cap, c. 440 BC. The Athenian elite had a considerable respect for the Thracian horsemanship and emulated the Thracian dress and style of warfare.

Teres, who is claimed to have lived 92 years, had died by the outbreak of the Peloponnesian War in 431. His successor was his son Sitalces, whose reign is mostly known thanks to the account of Thucydides. Before the war he is known to have campaigned against the Paeonians in the west, subjugating some of the tribes living along the upper reaches of the Strymon. Now, his influence extended over much of Bulgaria, Greek and Turkish Thrace and also parts of southeastern Romania: from the Strymon and Iskar rivers in the west to the Black Sea and the Propontis in the east as well as the Haemus and the mouth of the Danube (which was ruled by the tributary Getae) in the north. According to Thucydides, the Odrysian state was "very powerful, and in revenue and general prosperity exceeded all the nations of Europe which lie between the Ionian Sea and the Euxine [Black Sea]."

In the south, much of coastal Thrace had passed under the rule of Athens, making them direct neighbours of the Odrysians. The Athenians had already taken some interest in the Thracian interior before 431, but it was in said year when they concluded an alliance with Sitalces against Perdiccas II of Macedon in the west. This pact was cemented by a dynastic marriage, as Sitalces would marry the sister of the Athenian ambassador, Nymphodoros of Abdera. Sitalces' son Sadokos was sent to Athens and was granted the Athenian citizenship. Sitalces, apparently an experienced leader with political acumen, would prove his commitment to the alliance in the next year, when he arrested a Peloponnesian embassy that tried to persuade him to join the Spartan side and handed it over to Athens.

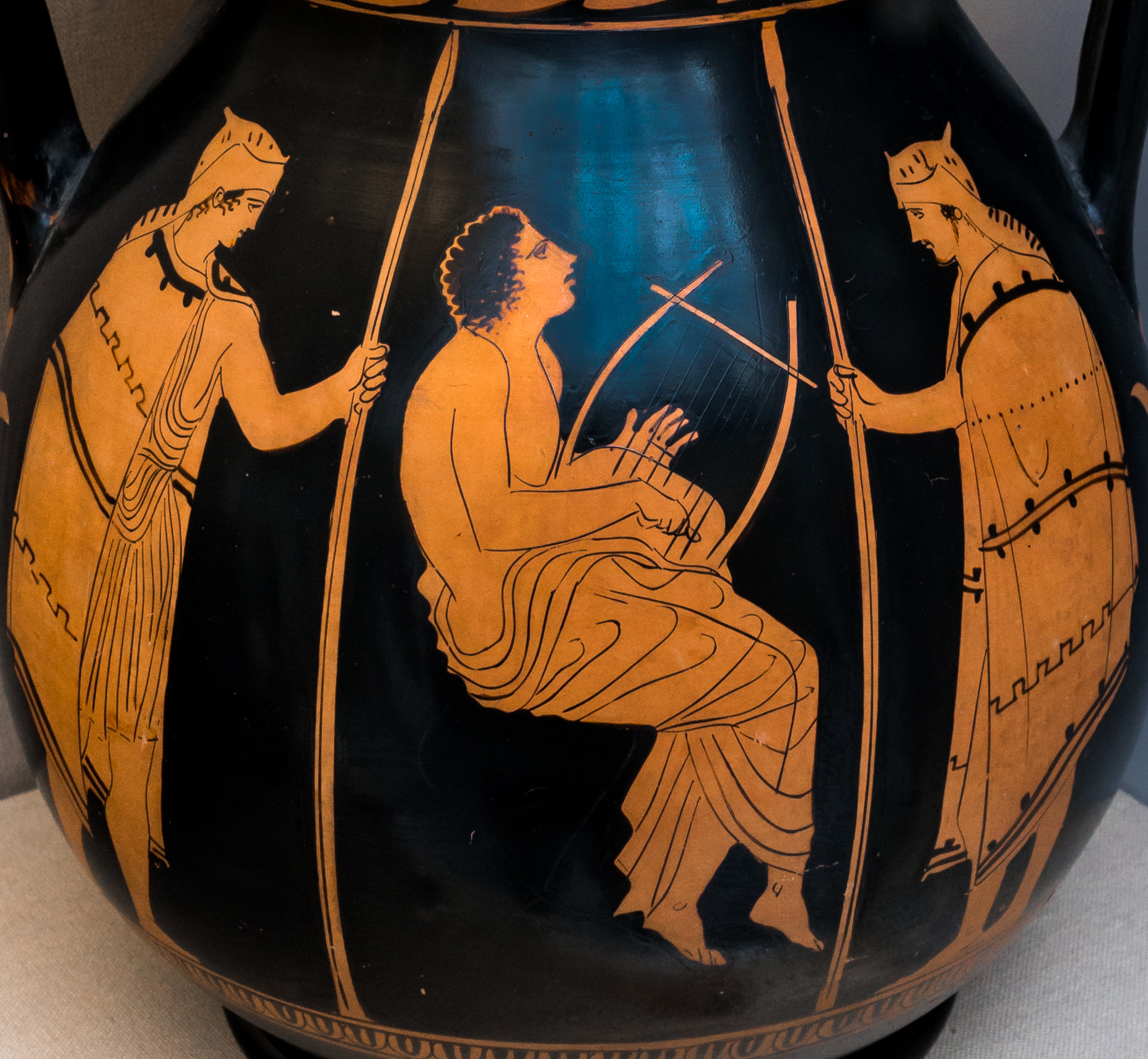
Greek vase painting of Orpheus singing for two Thracian warriors, c. 430 BC

At the turn of the year 428, Sitalces raised a massive, multi-ethnic army to march against Macedon and insurgents on the Chalkidiki peninsula. His army consisted of a variety of Thracians (some, like those of the Rhodopes, were independent, but joined nonetheless), Getae and some Paeonians. While Sitalces managed to subjugate some of the Thracian tribes of the lower Strymon, his invasion of eastern Macedon and the Chalkidiki was less successful, as his opponents avoided open combat and simply hid behind their walls. The Odrysian army had not the means to storm them, plus winter was approaching and food supplies were running out. Furthermore, the Athenian force that was promised to them never arrived, perhaps because Athens feared the might of the unleashed Thracian kingdom. After failed negotiations with Perdiccas II, Sitalces retreated back home. Thus, after only 30 days the Odrysian invasion had come to an end.

==== Seuthes I ====
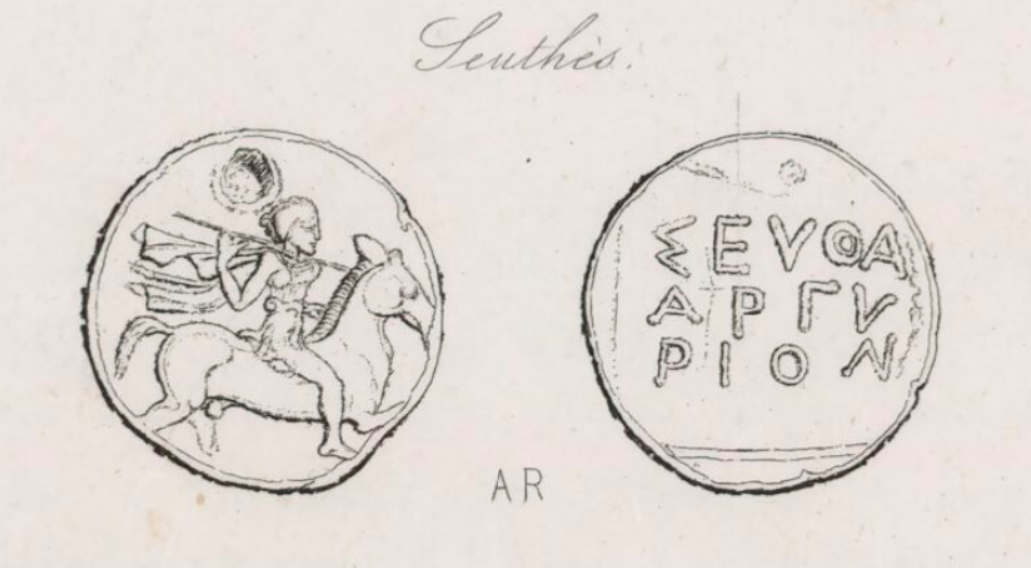
Coin of either Seuthes I or Seuthes II

Sitalces was succeeded in 424 by his nephew Seuthes I after the former was killed while campaigning against the Triballi, who resided north of the western Haemus. Throughout his reign, the Odrysians did not intervene in coastal Thrace, which had now become a contested battlefield between Athens and Sparta. Athens for its part began to make heavy use of Thracian mercenaries acting as light skirmishers, the peltasts. Due to their success the Greeks soon began to raise peltast units of their own. Still, the Athenians eventually lost the Peleponnesian war and, for a few years at least, much of their influence in the northern Aegean. Seuthes I was eventually succeeded by Amadocus I, also known as Medokos, in around 410 or 405 BC.

=== First signs of decay and brief revival under Cotys I (404–360 BC) ===
==== The civil wars between Amadocus I and Seuthes II ====
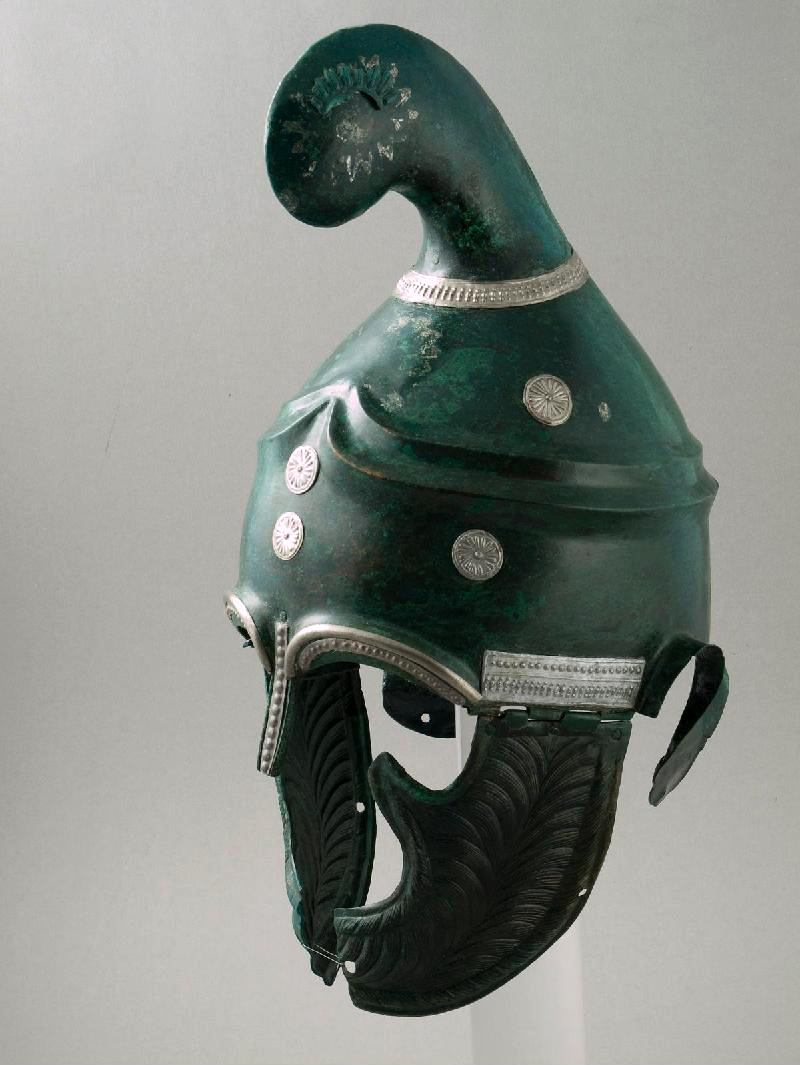
Thraco-Phrygian bronze helmet with silver appliques. Pletena, first half of the 4th century BC

By the turn of the 4th century the Odrysian kingdom showed its tendency towards fragmentation. Two rulers are known by 405: Amadocus I and Seuthes II. The historian Diodorus Siculus even called both of them "kings of the Thracians", although this is most likely a misunderstanding: by 405 Seuthes II still considered Amadocus I as his suzerein. Amadocus was the son of a previous king Sitalces, while Seuthes II was the son of a Thracian chieftain named Maisades. Maisades was a descendant of king Teres, making Seuthes II and Amadocus I distant relatives. There was also an autonomous Odrysian prince in the western hinterlands of Byzantium named Teres.

Initially raised at the court of Amadocus, Seuthes was sent to eastern Thrace several years before 405. By 405 he had managed to consolidate his position over a realm stretching from Apollonia Pontica over the Strandzha to parts of the northern Propontis coast. In 400 BC he hired Greek mercenaries under Xenophon to expand his dominion at the cost of Teres and other rebels, forcing them to reacknowledge the authority of Amadocus. Due to lacking funds they left his service already after two months. Seuthes II eventually rose against Amadocus, although little is known about this insurrection. In 389 the Athenian general Thrasybulus mediated between the two parties, resulting in Seuthes II, whom Xenophon called "ruler of the coast region", recognizing Amadocus' authority again.

Amadocus, who had defied Seuthes' insurrection probably due to his own popularity, died soon after 389. His successor was Hebryzelmis, about whom very little is known, but who, like Amadocus, sought the good will of Athens. Seuthes II on the other hand allied with Sparta. An Athenian inscription from the year 386/5 confirms that Hebryzelmis sent a delegation to Athens to legitimize his rule and/or gain an ally against Seuthes. However, the Athenians had little interest in another war in the region and thus limited themselves to kind words. Meanwhile, Seuthes had risen yet again against the crown. This second war went badly, as he seemingly lost all of his domains before reconquering them thanks to a mercenary army led by Iphicrates. Iphicrates subsequently married the daughter of Seuthes' son, Cotys I.

==== Renaissance under Cotys I ====
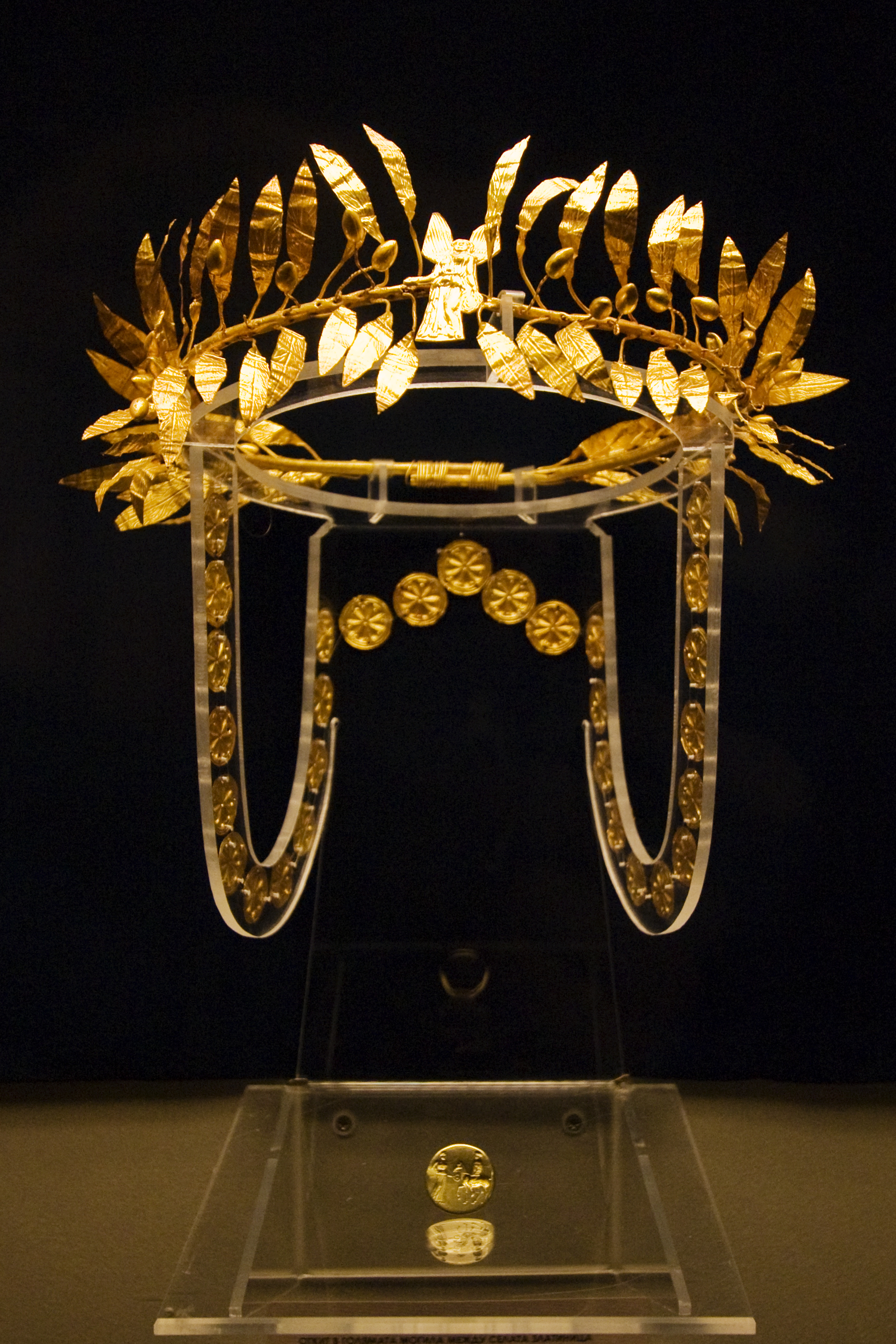
A golden wreath and ring from the burial of an Odrysian aristocrat at the Golyamata Mogila tumulus (mid-4th century BC)

Cotys I succeeded Seuthes II in 383. The historian Michael Zahrnt described Cotys as "the right man to strengthen the run-down Odrysian realm, vigorous, and an artful diplomat [...]." Indeed, it was under him that the kingdom reached its greatest might and became a considerable political factor in the nascent Hellenistic world. He was also the only Odrysian king whose character was excessively discussed by ancient scholars, although primarily in a rather unfavourable way. While virtually nothing is known about the early years of his rule it is clear that he, together with his son-in-law Iphicrates, managed to conquer the domains of the deceased Hebryzelmis, thus uniting the Odrysian realm under his rule. In 375 he faced an invasion of the Triballi, who devastated the western parts of the realm while marching towards Abdera at the coast.

Cotys eventually set his eyes on the strategic Chersonese and the Hellespont, challenging the Athenian hegemony in the region. The Athenians were more than ready to fight for the control of the Hellespont, as it was vital for Athens' grain supply from the northern Black Sea region. An early invasion in 367 failed, but in 363/2 Cotys was more successful and repeatedly defeated several Athenian generals. Thus, the Chersonese and the Hellespont had come under direct Odrysian rule. This achievement, however, proved short-lived: much to Athens relief, Cotys I was eventually murdered in 360/59.

=== Disintegration and conquest by Macedon (360–340 BC) ===
==== The three kingdoms ====
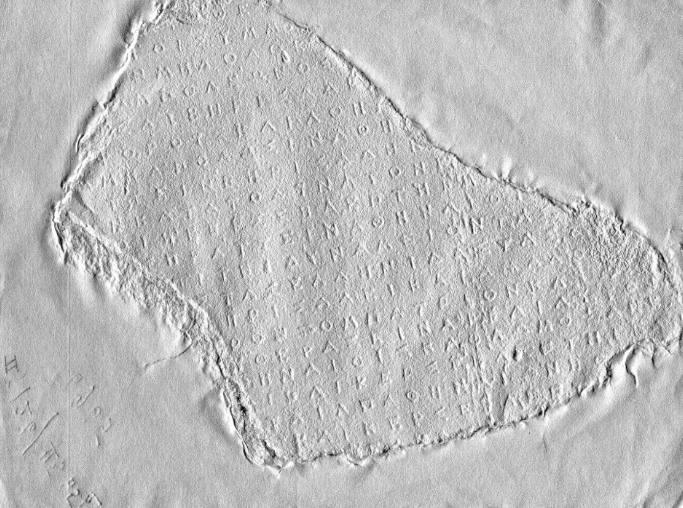
The peace treaty between Athens and the three Odrysian kings Cersebleptes, Amadocus and Berisades as recorded in a Greek inscription from Athens, 357/6 BC

The death of Cotys, almost contemporary to the coronation of the talented Philip II of Macedon, marked the beginning of the kingdom's downfall. The Odrysian state was divided among three competing kings: Cersebleptes, the son of Cotys, ruled the eastern parts beyond the lower Hebros and Tonzos; Amadocus II, perhaps a son of Amadocus I, ruled central Thrace between Maroneia and the Meritsa; Berisades controlled the western part from Maroneia in the east to the Styrmon in the west. (Note: The historian Peter Delev is less explicit while describing the realms of Amadocus II and Berisades: "Amadocus, probably a son of Medocus the Odrysian king in Xenophon's Anabasis, took the mountainous hinterland of Maroneia; while one Berisades established himself in the area around the lower Nestos. It remains unknown who of the three new kings took the rich inland plain of the Upper Hebros.")

Cersebleptes was the most ambitious of the three. He continued his father's war against Athens for the Chersonese, while also striving to reunite the Odrysian kingdom. His attempts proved futile, for Amadocus II and Berisades, who received support from Athens, resisted his attacks. In 357 he was forced to accept a peace treaty that sealed the division of the Odrysian state. An inscription from Athens describes said treaty. First, Cersebleptes had to cease his hostilities in the Cheresonese. Second, all three kings and Athens agreed to share their tributes received from the Greek colonies along the Aegean and the Hellespont. Third, the kings promised to enter an alliance with Athens and both sides had to provide each other with military support if tributary Greek colonies revolted. Cersebleptes, however, soon quit that treaty and continued his war in the Chersonese.

==== Conquest by Philip II ====
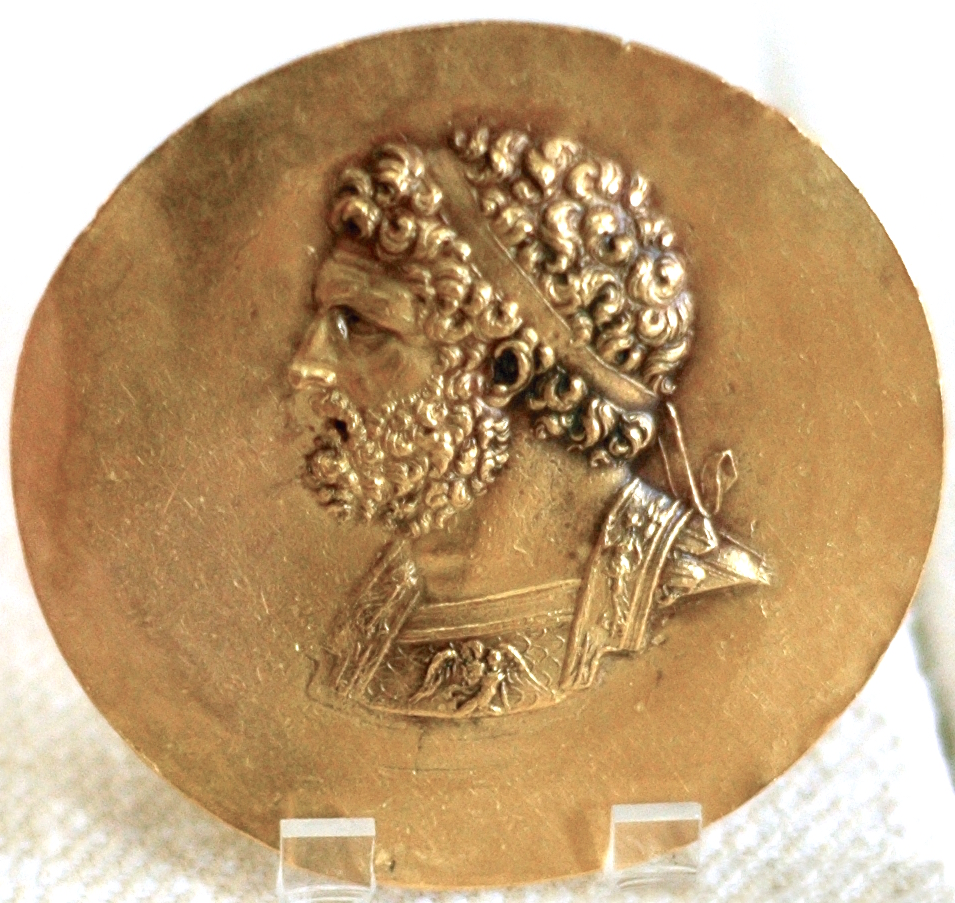
Roman medallion of Philip II

As early as 359, the year of his coronation, Philip II of Macedon I contacted a "Thracian king" to persuade him to not harbour a Macedonian pretender to the throne. This king is probably to be identified with the western Odrysian king Berisades. A year later he unified Macedon and subjugated the Paeonians to the northeast. In these early years he did not bother much with Thrace yet, as he regarded the infighting Odrysian kingdoms as no threat for his rule. A first push into the kingdom of Berisades and his successor Cetriporis occurred in 357/6, when he conquered Amphipolis and Crenides. The latter was made into a garrison town called Philippi that was to serve as a launch pad for future invasions into the interior. Cetriporis allied himself with the kings of Paeonia and Illyria, but Philip II defeated them one by one. Cetriporis was allowed to keep his kingdom, at least for a few more years.

Cersebleptes continued his attempts to unite the Odrysian kingdoms: in 353/4 he and Philip discussed the invasion of the kingdom of Amadocus II and the Athenian domains in Thrace, while around a year later he marched against the kingdom of Cetriporis. Meanwhile, Athens feared a possible alliance between Philip and Cersebleptes and decided to make an example by conquering the town of Sestos and eradicating its population. Intimidated, Cersebleptes renounced his claims on much of the Chersonese and allied with Athens. This was unacceptable for Philip, who allied with Amadocus II and marched against Cersebleptes. After besieging him in his residence in Heraion Teichos in 351, he forced the Thracian king to surrender and took his son as a hostage. Around this time, Philip also abolished Cetriporis' kingdom and deposed Amadocus II in favour of Teres II.

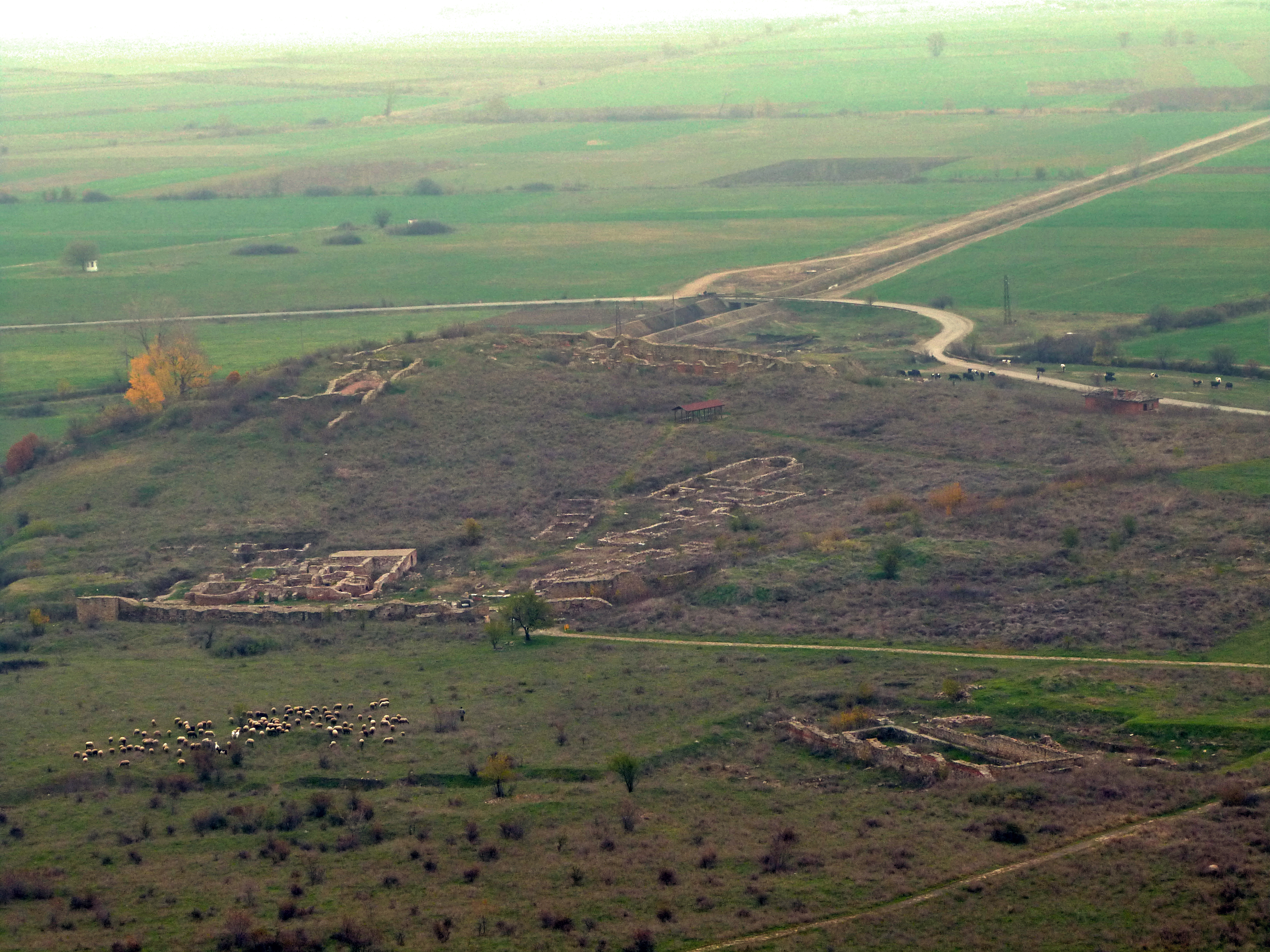
The remains of ancient Cabyle in eastern Bulgaria, (re-)founded by Philip II during the final stages of the Odrysian war in 341 or 340 BC

After these events, the Thracian front remained peaceful until 347 or early 346, when the Athenians again attempted to strengthen their presence in Thrace, which they probably did at the request of Cersebleptes. Macedon expelled the Athenian garrisons and defeated the Odrysians, preventing yet again a Thraco-Athenian alliance against him. As a result of this campaign Philip also put the Aeagean coast as far east as Acontisma (not the banks of the Nestos river as often assumed) under direct Macedonian administration.

A few years later Cersebleptes allied with Teres II and invaded the Chersonese, which was now under Macedon's protection. After asking the Persian king Artaxerxes III to cut the support of the Ionian towns for Cersebleptes, Philip finally felt confident enough to begin his most ambitious project so far: the conquest of inland Thrace in the form of a large campaign that would last from 342 to 340. Few details are known about this campaign. It seems to have started in May or June, when Philip's army penetrated the interior by marching upstream the Martisa river. The Odrysians resisted valiantly and confronted the Macedonians in many battles. Philip faced several setbacks and even seems to have lost at least one battle. By the spring of 341, fighting was still raging and Philip was forced to call in reinforcements. Although detailed evidence is lacking he finally managed to improve his situation and defeated Cersebleptes and Teres at some point between the second half of 341 and the first half of 340.

==== Rise of the Getic kingdom ====
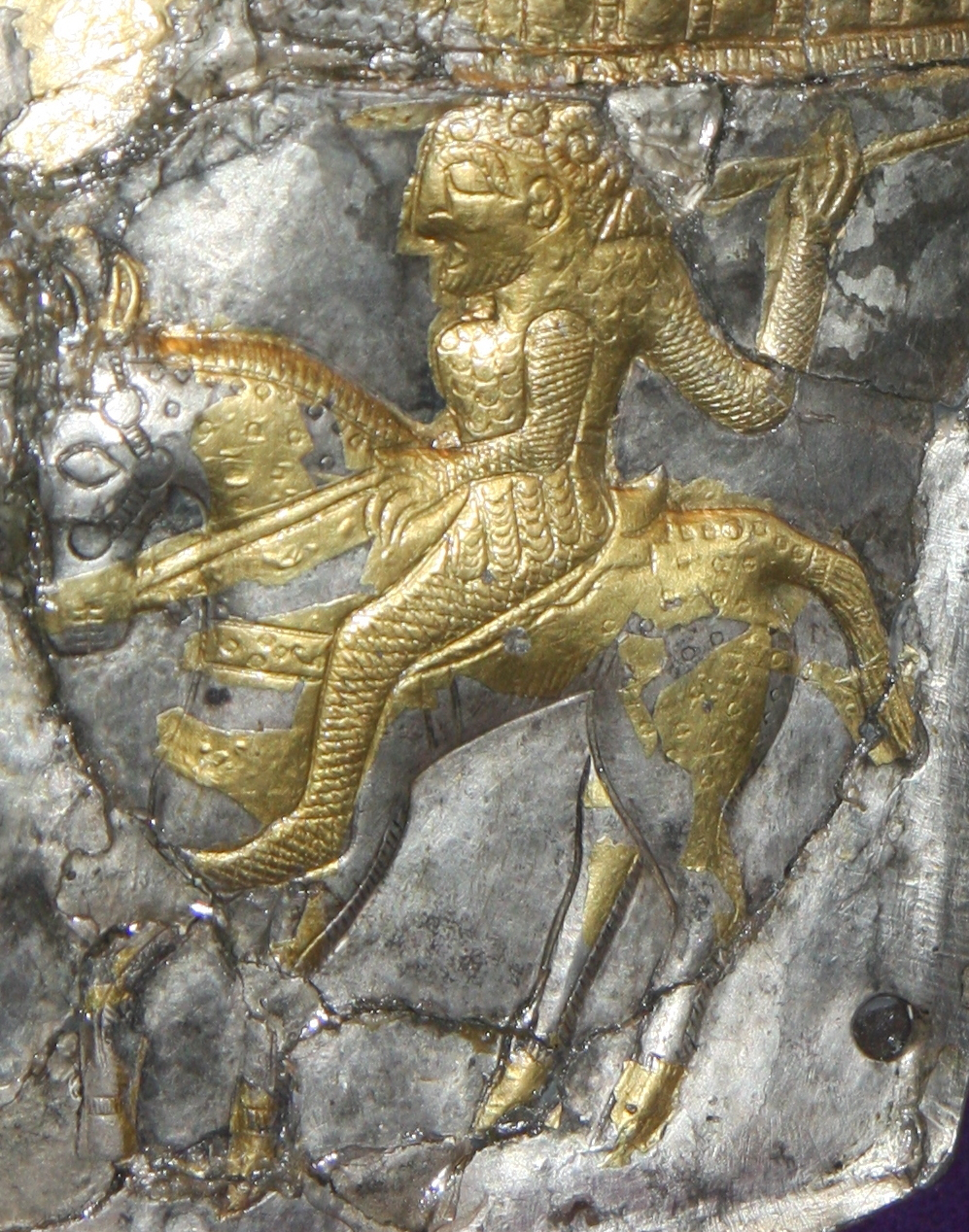
A horseman on a Getic silver helmet from Agighiol, 4th century BC

The Getae, a northern Thracian people located between the northeastern foothills of the Haemus range and the lower Danube and the Black Sea, had been part of the Odrysian realm since Teres I, even though it is not clear how tightly they were actually incorporated into the state. When and how the Getae became independent is not discussed in the available sources. Perhaps they became independent during the rule of Cotys I or after his death in 360. Rich funeral treasures from the second half of the 4th century, like those of Agighiol, Peretu or Borovo, attest to the increasing wealth of the Getic elite. Several artefacts seem to have originated in the Odrysian kingdom and may well have been prestige gifts.

By the middle of the 4th century, there existed a Getic kingdom that was to thrive for a century. The Getic capital was Helis, which has been identified with the archaeological site of Sboryanovo, which was founded in the 330s or early 320s and housed around 10.000 inhabitants. It seems that the Getae also became active in Muntenia north of the Danube, a region that would come to constitute a part of the "Dacia" of imperial Roman historiography. The first Getic king to appear in the sources was Cothelas, who married his daughter Meda to Philip II, thus concluding an alliance between the two states. This probably happened during or shortly after Philip's conquest of the Odrysians. The kingdom survived two wars with Lysimachus and the Celtic invasion in around 280, but eventually disintegrated a few decades later. Helis/Sboryanovo was completely destroyed by an earthquake in the middle of the 3rd century.

=== The rebellion of Seuthes and the kingdom of Seuthopolis (c. 330 – second quarter of the 3rd century BC) ===
==== Macedonian Thrace ====
Southern Thrace as part of Philip's II empire

The conquest of the Odrysian kingdoms doubled the size of the domains ruled by Philip II, even though inland Thrace was not transformed into a Macedonian province, but was put under the loose control of a Strategos. Local Thracian rulers who seemed trustworthy were allowed to rule on Macedonian behalf, granted that they would pay a tithe and provide troops. Such troops, generally called "Thracians" or "Odrysians", participated in the Macedonian conquest of Persia under Philip's successor Alexander the Great and were probably commanded by Odrysian noblemen. Philip founded several towns in Thrace to ease Macedonian rule, most prominently Cabyle and Philippopolis. The situation south of the Haemus remained largely stable for the next few years, albeit even here, Macedon never managed to impose its rule over all Thracian tribes. Macedon's rule was precarious and a potential Odrysian upstarter could count on the support of much of the disgruntled population.

==== Seuthes III and the Odrysian revival ====
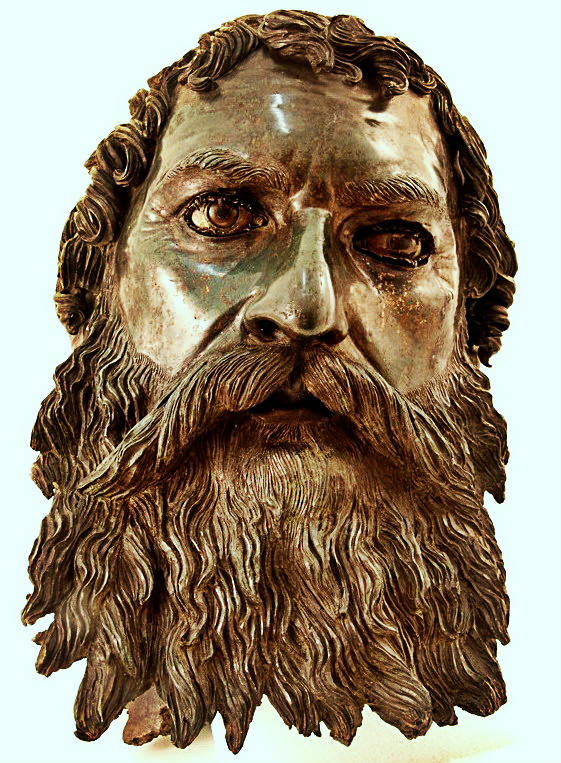
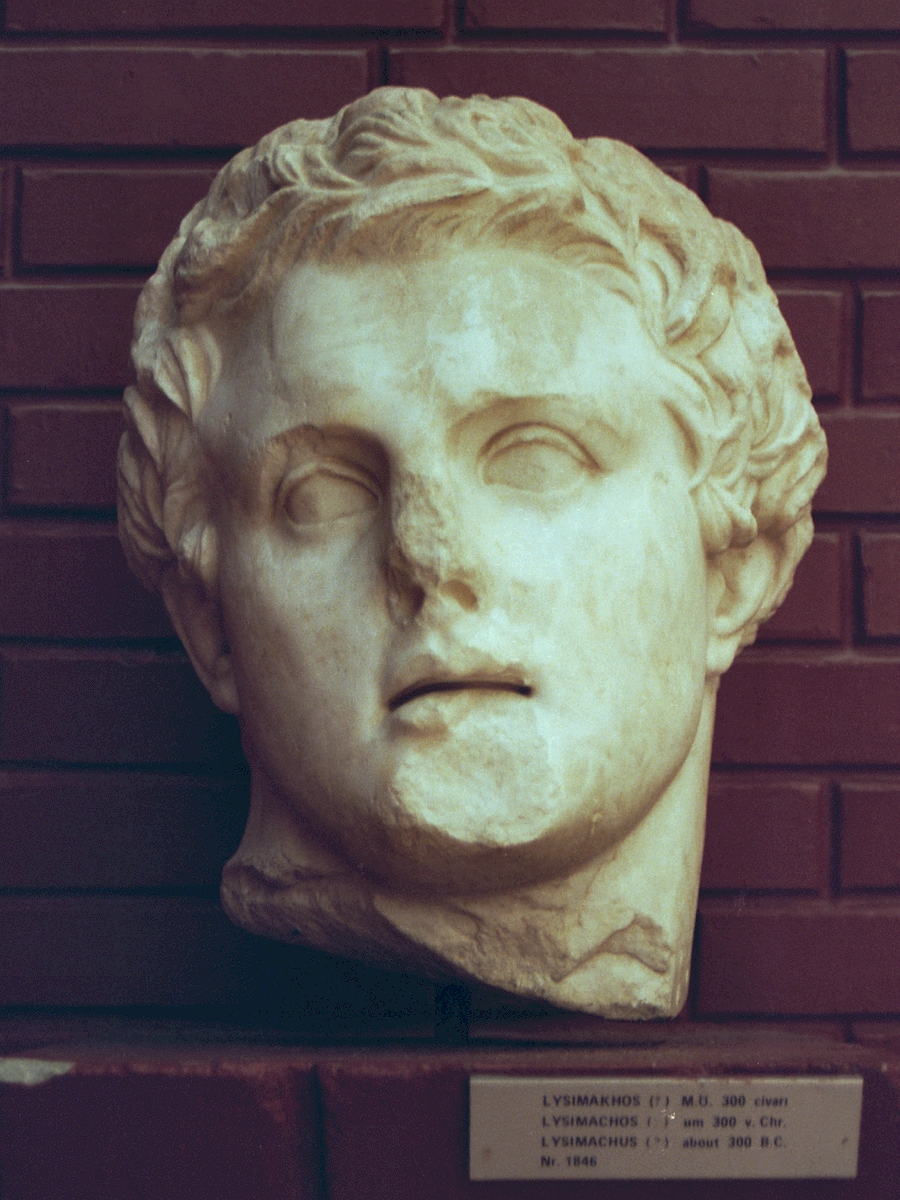
Left: Bust of Seuthes III, Kazanlak Right: Bust of Lysimachus, Ephesos

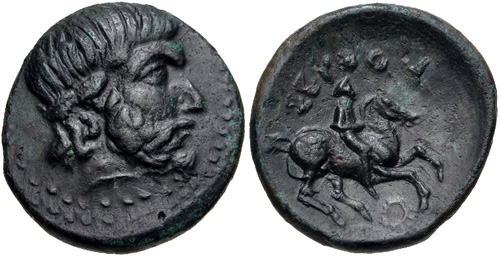
Coin of Seuthes III

With Alexander's absence in Asia, the Strategoi of Thrace engaged in rebellions and failed expeditions against the Getae, greatly unsettling the country in the process. At the end of the 330s or in the mid-320s (the dating is not entirely clear), a certain Seuthes, later known as Seuthes III, instigated a Thracian rebellion. He seems to have been an Odrysian and may have been associated with the royal house of Cersebleptes, although his social background must remain speculation.

After Alexander's death in 323, one of his bodyguards named Lysimachus was appointed as the satrap of Thrace. Soon after his arrival he faced off with Seuthes, who had rallied much of Thrace around his banner. Seuthes' goal seems to have been the revival of an independent Odrysian state. A battle ensued between him and Lysimachus, which Lysimachus barely and by no means decisively won. Both sides prepared for a second conflict, but the primary source for this event, Diodorus Siculus, provides no details on its outcome.

In any case, both parties eventually reached a settlement, restricting Seuthes to the interior and Lysimachus to the coastal regions of the Aegean and Black Sea. There is no evidence for Lysimachus vassalizing Seuthes. Thrace north of the Rhodopes probably remained outside of Lysimachus' reach, as he may have regarded its pacification not worth the money and manpower. In 313 Seuthes allied with revolting Greek towns on the western shore of the Black Sea, but Lysimachus defeated this alliance. It is possible that to guarantee the peace between the two opponents, Seuthes married a daughter of Lysimachus named Berenice. Afterwards, there is no evidence for another confrontation between the two.

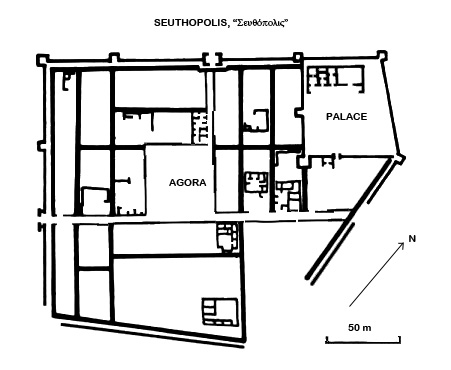
Floor plan of Seuthopolis

Seuthes was keen to establish a Hellenistic kingdom, although he avoided to label himself as king on his coins. Probably after the death of Alexander in 323, Seuthes founded a town at the Tonzos river, near modern Kazanlak. He named it after himself: Seuthopolis. The town was primarily based on contemporary Macedonian foundations and showed heavy Greek influences. Seuthopolis probably acted as the capital of Seuthes' kingdom. The size and power of this kingdom should not be overestimated, as its influence was most likely limited to the hinterland of Seuthopolis, in particular the valley between the Rhodopes in the south to the Haemus in the north and the Syrmus in the west to the upper Tonzos in the east. Thus, his realm only covered the northwestern fringes of the former Odrysian empire. Seuthes also only issued bronze coins, which were insufficient to challenge the Macedonian economic hegemony and its royal mintings in more precious metals.

==== Fall of Seuthopolis ====
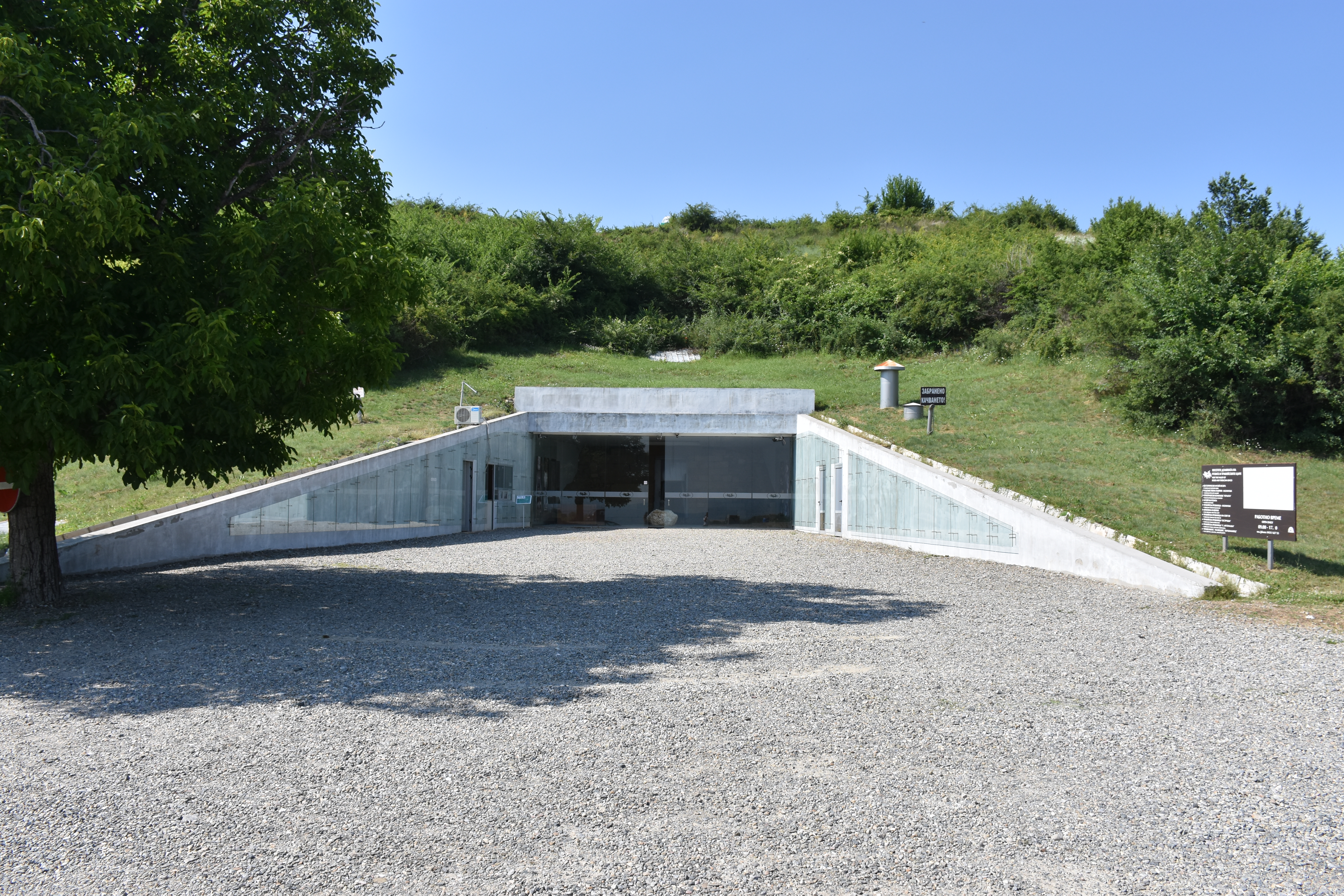
The entrance to the tomb of Seuthes III near Kazanlak (modern replica)

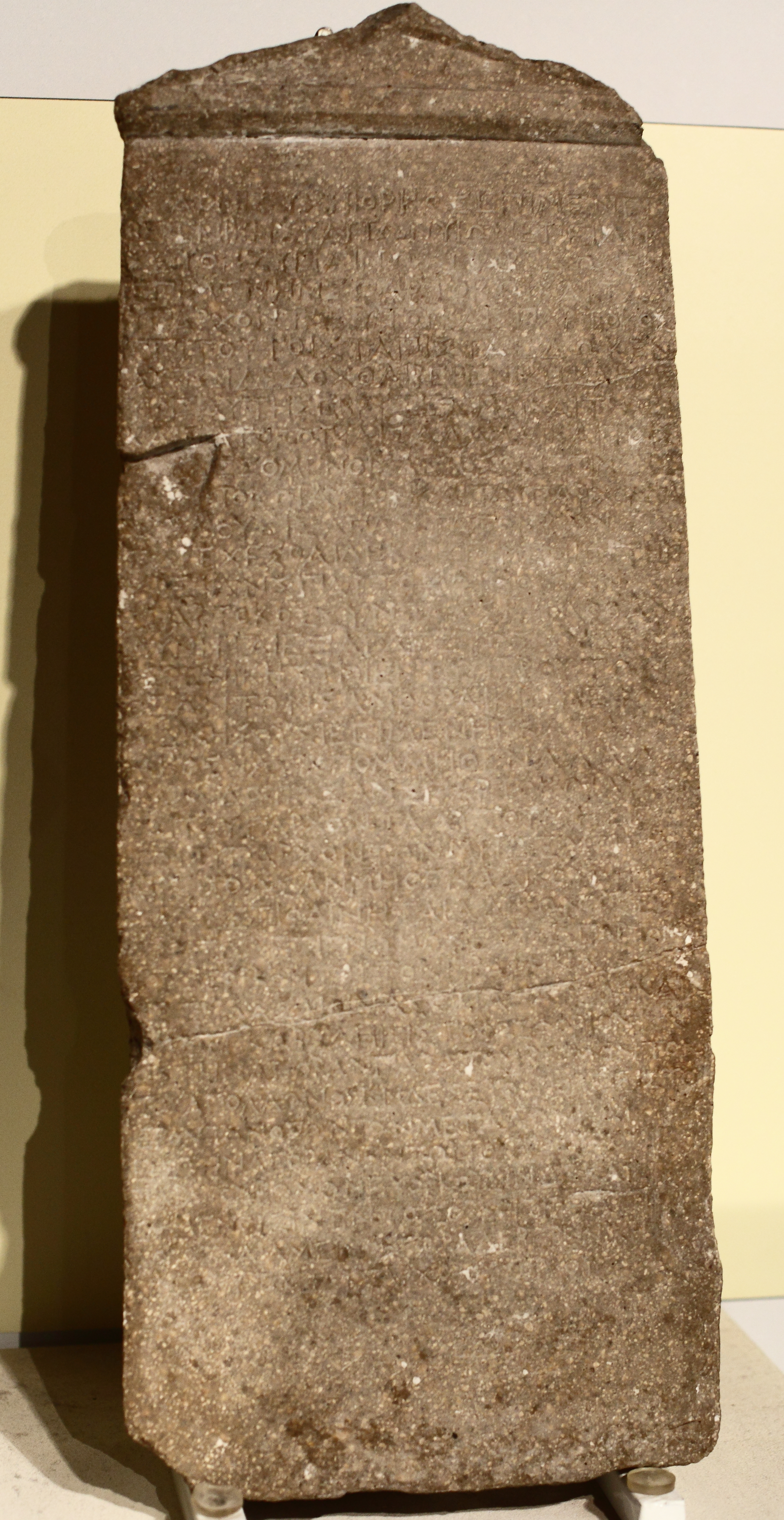
The Greek Seuthopolis inscription from the turn of the 3rd century. It mentions Berenice as the presumed widow of Seuthes III, their four sons and the king of Cabyle, Spartokos.

It is unknown when Seuthes III died, with estimations ranging from the end of the 4th century to the 280s. Coins minted in his name include overstruck coins of Cassander (died 297) and Lysimachus (died 281), implying that his coins were produced until the early years of the 3rd century BC. Seuthes was symbolically buried in the tumulus of Golyama Kosmatka, without his actual corpse. It may well be that he had been killed in battle, perhaps fighting against Lysimachus or with him as an ally.

A long inscription from Seuthopolis attests to the decline of the fortunes of the town and the trouble in Seuthes' household. It mentions the wife of Seuthes, Berenice, and their four (probably underage) sons Hebryzelmis, Teres, Satocos and Satalas. The document was issued in the name of Berenice and includes the phrase "when Seuthes was in good health", which implies that by the time of writing, he was either dead or dying and that Berenice had taken the rule. The inscription describes negotiations between Berenice and Spartokos, the ruler of Cabyle, a town once founded by Philip II. Indeed, Cabyle had not remained a Macedonian fort for long, but began to mint coins and developed into a city-state with considerable influence. Spartokos is known from several coins minted after 281 where he is addressed as king (basileus).

Although not mentioned in the Seuthopolis inscription and known only from a few coins and an inscription in a grave from Kazanlak, Seuthes seemed to have another son named Roigos, who eventually became king. (Note: An Athenian decree from 330 BC mentions a certain "Rebulas, the son of Seuthes and brother of Cotys", who is often assumed to have been a son of Seuthes III. However, he could also very well have been a son of Seuthes II.) The fate of Seuthes' dynasty remains enigmatic. Other Thracian monarchs recorded in sources from the 3rd century, like Cotys or Scostocus, can not be proved to have been Odrysian, even if they are often labelled as such by modern authors.

The end of Seuthopolis is a matter of debate, but it is clear that the town was destroyed still in the first half of the 3rd century. According to some scholars it was conquered by the Celts in the 270s. The Celts were ravaging much of the Balkan Peninsula since the early 270s and also led numerous incursions into Thrace. In c. 278 and led by Comontorius, they eventually founded a kingdom in eastern Thrace centered around Tylis. A newer theory proposes the destruction of the town in the 250s, based on a revamped dating of pottery, numismatic evidence and the presence of several Celtic artefacts. The archaeological evidence also shows the employment of siege artillery, which is unlikely to have been utilized by Celts. It may therefore be that Seuthopolis was not destroyed by the Celts, but by the Seleucid king Antiochus II, who campaigned in the Thracian interior in around 252.

=== The Odrysians after 250 BC ===
Most modern historians believe that the Odrysian kingdom continued to exist throughout the Hellenistic and the early Imperial period, when it became a Roman vassal state. However, the evidence for this assumption is in fact very slim. Throughout the remainder of the 3rd century, Thrace remained fragmented into various political entities. In the interior ruled various badly known Thracian dynasts. In the east was the kingdom of Tylis, a Celtic-dominated predator state which existence was based on blackmailing tribute and that was eventually destroyed by a Thracian revolt or attack soon after 220. In the southeast and based at the town of Lysimachia, the Seleucids established themselves under Antiochus II (r. 261–246), who relied on allied Thracian dynasts to expand his influence deep into the interior. After his death in 246 the Seleucid presence was replaced by that of the Ptolemies, who established a satrapy in coastal Thrace. An Odrysian kingdom, however, is not described in the sources.

In the last years of the 3rd century, Macedonia under king Philip V began a renewed expansion to the east, exploiting the weakness of the Ptolemies after the death of Ptolemy IV. While Philip's initial focus was on coastal Thrace, he also led a campaign into the interior. Temporarily losing his Thracian holdings after the end of the Second Macedonian War in 197, he reconquered most of them a decade later, while again campaigning in the Thracian interior. In 184 or 183 he pushed into the plains of the upper Hebros, defeated the Odrysians and other local tribes and conquered Philipopolis, although the Odrysians reconquered the town soon afterwards. It may be noteworthy that no Odrysian king is mentioned. While in 181, Philip was still climbing the Haemus in northern Thrace, his Thracian empire collapsed with his death two years later.

Between 171 and 168, Philip's heir Perseus engaged the Roman Republic in the Third Macedonian War. Perseus' most trusted ally in this war was the Thracian king Cotys, whom the historian Polybius calls an Odrysian. He fought in the battles of Callinicus and Pydna, but eventually became a Roman ally after the war. Perhaps he is identical with the Cotys mentioned by the historian Strabo. (Note: Strabo briefly stated that the Odrysians were ruled by the kings Amadocus, Cersobleptes, Berisades, Seuthes, and Cotys. The identification of the first three names with the kings who split the Odrysian king in three parts is obvious, while Seuthes has been identified with Seuthes III. Curiously enough, Polybius noted that the father of Cotys was a man named Seuthes.) However, his Odrysian background has been doubted, as the account of Polybius, the only remaining source (minus Livy, who relied on Polybius), called him an Odrysian only once, while also calling the Getic king Dromichaetes an Odrysian. It may thus be likely that Polybius used "Odrysian" as a synonym for "Thracian". Furthermore, after the war Cotys was described as being active in the hinterland of Abdera at the Aegean coast, implying that he was rather a Sapaean king, who are known to have resided in the Rhodopes. His identity must remain uncertain. It is a fact, however, that Cotys was the last king in the sources to be explicitly labelled an "Odrysian". There is also no evidence that Odrysians had any affiliations with the royal houses of the Sapaeans and Asti of the 1st century BC.

By the middle of the 1st century BC, the Romans dominated coastal Thrace, while the most important Thracian tribes were the Sapaeans and the Asti. The Romans decided not to implement an administration in the Thracian interior, but instead relied on indirect influence via a large, Hellenized client kingdom resembling the Odrysian kingdom of old. Probably soon after the Battle of Actium in 31 BC, the Romans abolished the Asti dynasty and established the Sapaeans in Bizye, the capital of the former. The Sapaeans of Bizye created a large kingdom loyal to Rome and even expanded into the interior. Little is known about how the Sapaeans administered this region, although they made Philippopolis a royal residence. In 21 AD king Rhoemetalces II took refuge in Philippopolis when he was confronted with a rebellion, among them Odrysians. While the historian Tacitus described them as powerful, their uprising failed due to their bad coordination. The Romans eventually dissolved the Sapaean kingdom in 45/6 and turned it into the province of Thracia.

== Kingship and the nature of Odrysian rule ==
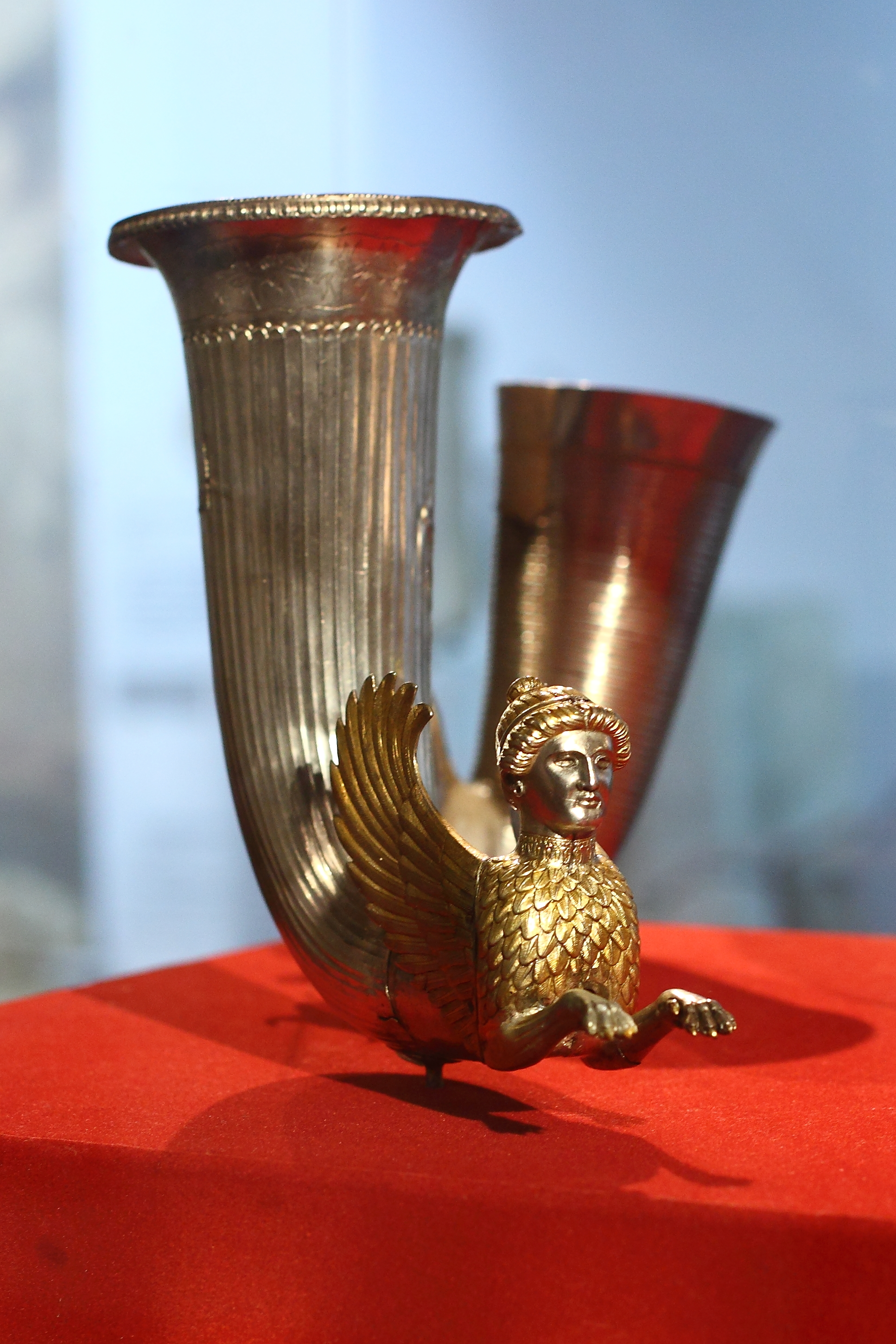
Silver rhyton from the Borovo treasure (4th century BC). An inscription on its belly mentions king Cotys I.

Although covering almost a third of the entire Balkan peninsula at its peak, the Odrysian kingdom is unlikely to have had state-like institutions before the reign of Seuthes III. In general, the Odrysian kingship was heavily influenced by the Persian court, while also bearing many similarities to the one practiced in Macedon. Unlike in the contemporary Greek city-states, the Odrysian kings needed to legitimize their rule by military prowess, religion and gifts. The royal gift exchange, a practice originally adopted from the Persian court, was especially important for legitimation. Thucydides noted that the total tribute of 400 talents of gold and silver generated under king Seuthes I was distributed among Seuthes as well as the "chief men and nobles of the Odrysae". Several inscribed silver vessels mention king Cotys I and Cersebleptes and were most likely gifts or tribute. While the king received valuable gifts like gold, silver, textiles or horses, he was also expected to distribute gifts like artefacts, women or land to earn the loyalty and achieve the expansion of his military retinue. Such systems are inevitably unstable, royal authority would always remain rather fluid.

Due to the fragmentary nature of the remaining sources, the royal court and the administration of the kingdom must remain largely obscure. It can be assumed that, as in early Macedon, the Odrysian kings formed the heart of the realm and controlled the policy and the minting of coins, appointed loyal deputies and commanded the troops on the battlefield. The realm was essentially the king's estate. Below the king was an elite of horse warriors and administrators deriving not only from the royal court, but also from rival tribes. Thucydides called said local rulers paradynasteuontes, meaning "those who share power". A similar elite class loyal only to the king, the hetairoi, could also be found in Macedon. The Odrysian kingdom appears to have been rather decentralized, consisting of many different regional elites vying for power. Their rule over their subjects, who lived in scattered hamlets, was very loose and exercised mainly through raiding and demanding tribute.

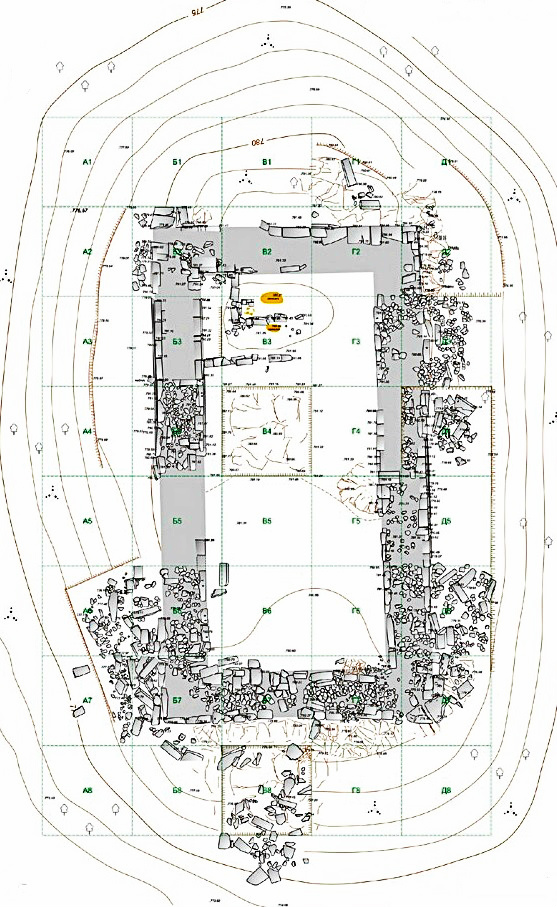
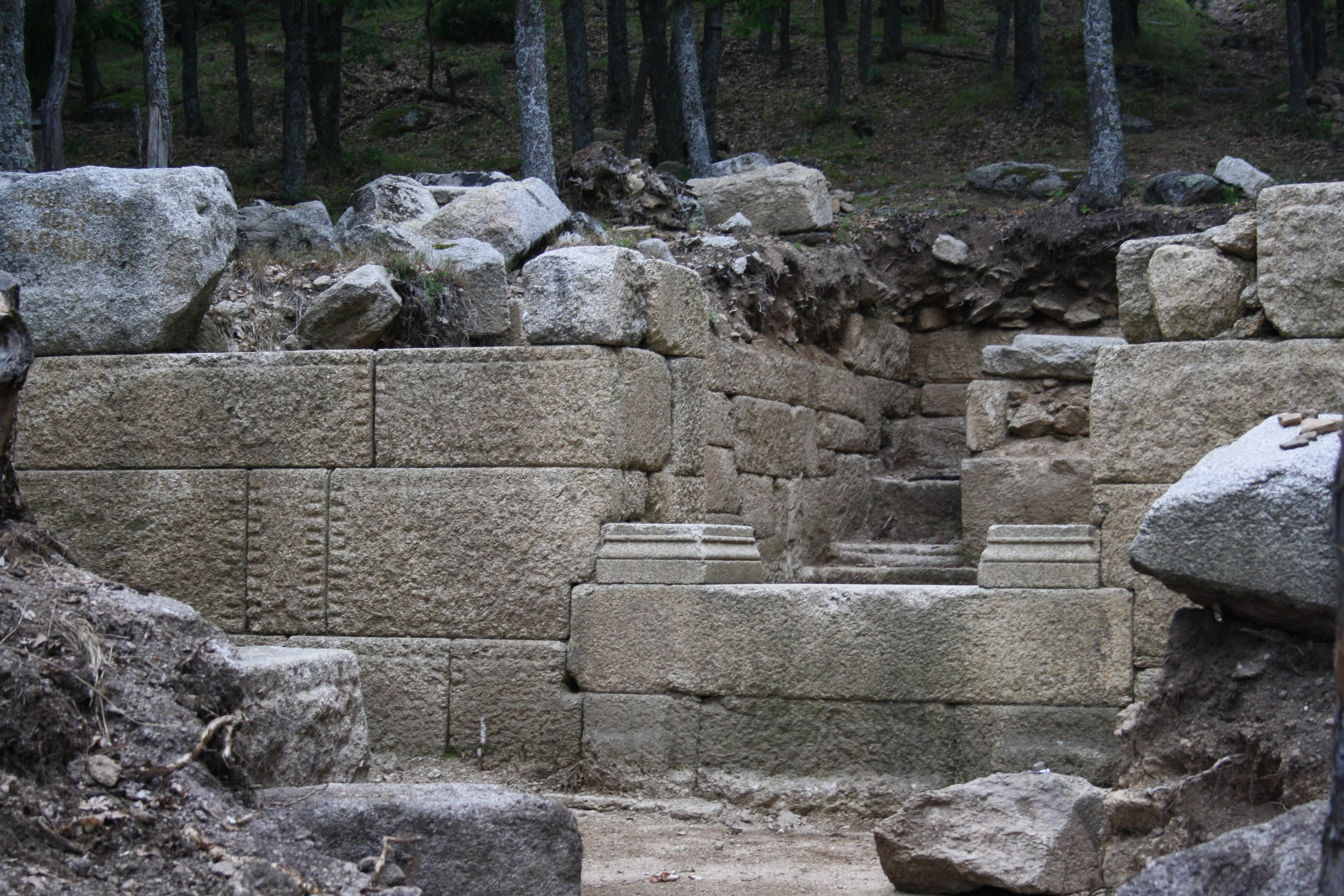
Left: Plan of the residence of Smilovene Right: Inside the residence of Kozi Gramadi

There is no evidence that the early Odrysian kings had a fixed capital. Instead, they probably maintained a mobile court, moving throughout the kingdom and residing in fortified residences. These small fortified places, which the Greeks called thyrseis, were the backbones of the Thracian aristocracy in a society that did not build towns or cities. This changed somewhat in the late 4th century, when Seuthes III founded Seuthopolis, marking the establishment of early state-like institutions which were probably inspired by those of Hellenistic Macedon. Seuthopolis' size always remained quite small, housing not more than 1.000 inhabitants. It is very likely that it was the home of the kingdom's aristocracy, while the common population continued to live outside the city walls, still practicing the agro-pastoral subsistence economy of old.

== Army ==
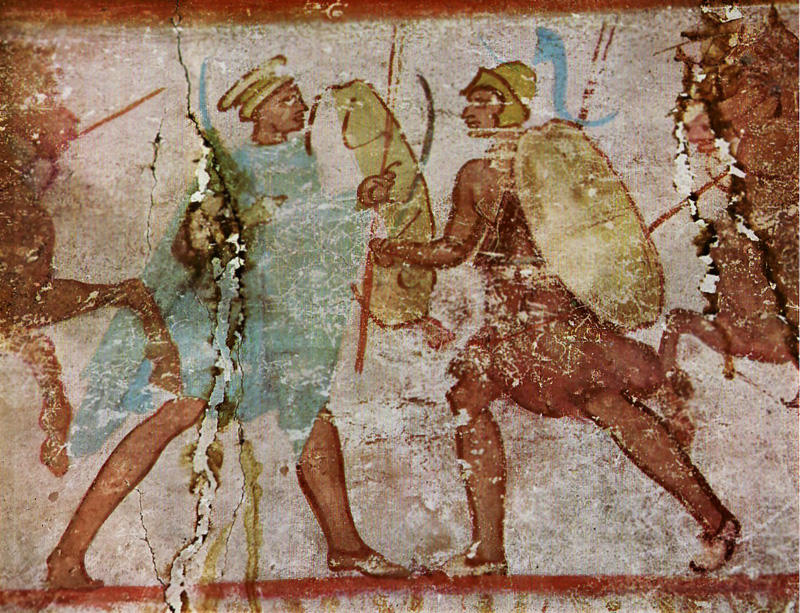
Two Thracian warriors on a painting from Kazanlak, c. 300 BC (Note: Located in the corridor of the Kazanlak tomb, the painting is divided into two friezes, each showing two groups of warriors respectively interacting with each other. It has been proposed that the one group represents Thracians and the other Macedonians, although their similar clothing and equipment make it more likely that all of them are Thracians, although of different tribes. The two warriors in this scene may be negotiating or duelling.)

When Sitalces' army invaded Macedon he supposedly fielded an army numbering 150,000 men, which is likely an inflated number. Around 100 years later, when Seuthes III confronted Lysimachus, the numbers had shrunk to 28,000 men. A considerable part of these armies were horsemen. Of Sitalces' army, every third warrior was a horseman, who were provided by the Odrysians and the Getae, while the army of Seuthes III had 8.000 riders, probably all Odrysians. The majority of Sitalces' infantry was described as being of rather low quality and was certainly composed of ill-organized levies. It therefore appears that warfare remained a heroic pursuit worthy only of the aristocracy, while military training for the commoners was considered unfitting. Despite this, the Thracian infantry made a great impression on the Greeks, who hired them as mercenaries. Meanwhile, the Odrysian kings made use of Greek mercenary commanders like Xenophon or Iphicrates, while Greek towns inside Thrace were defended by the colonists themselves.

Initially, the Odrysian army was divided into light infantry and light cavalry. The infantry used bows, slings, spears, swords, axes and light crescent-shaped shields called pelte, giving these warriors their name: "peltasts". Round and oval shields were, however, also utilized. A weapon primarily found in the western and central Rhodoes was the Rhomphaia. Except of slings, the cavalry used the same weapons as the infantry. In the later 5th century the Thracian cavalry began to adopt armour. The employed helmets were of the Chalcidian, Phrygian / Thracian and Corinthian types, of which the Chalcidian type seems to have been the most popular. The earliest torso armour was a type of primitive muscle cuirass of cylindrical form that had long fallen out of use elsewhere. Leather and linen armour was also worn. In the 4th century scale armour became popular, while greaves were also adopted at that time. Finally, there is also evidence that the Thracians employed siege artillery, in particular catapults.

== Culture ==
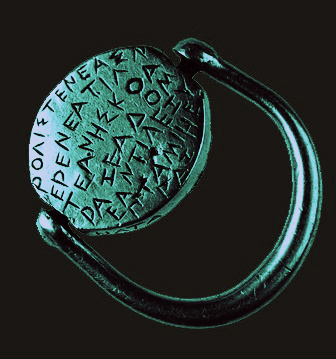
Ring from Ezerovo with a Thracian inscription in Greek letters, c. 400 BC

Odrysian crafts and metalworking were largely a product of Persian influence. Thracians as Dacians and Illyrians all decorated themselves with status-enhancing tattoos. Thracian warfare was affected also by Celts and the Triballi had adopted Celtic equipment. Thracian clothing is regarded for its quality and texture and was made up of hemp, flax or wool. Their clothing resembled that of the Scythians including jackets with coloured edges, pointed shoes and the Getai tribe were so similar to the Scythians that they were often confused with them. The nobility and some soldiers wore caps. There was a mutual influence between the Greeks and the Thracians. Greek customs and fashions contributed to the recasting of east Balkan society. Among the nobility Greek fashions in dress, ornament and military equipment were popular. Unlike the Greeks, the Thracians often wore trousers. Thracian kings were influenced by Hellenization. Greek as a lingua franca had been spoken at least by some members of the royal household in the fifth century BC and became the language of administrators; the Greek alphabet was adopted as the new Thracian script.

== Archaeology ==
Residences and temples of the Odrysian kingdom have been found, particularly around Starosel in the Sredna Gora mountains. Archaeologists have uncovered the northeastern wall of the Thracian kings' residence, 13 m in length and preserved up to 2 m in height. They also found the names of Cleobulus and Anaxandros, Philip II of Macedon's generals who led the assault on the Odrysian kingdom.

== List of Odrysian kings ==
The list below includes the known Odrysian kings of Thrace, but much of it is conjectural, based on incomplete sources, and the varying interpretation of ongoing numismatic and archaeological discoveries. Various other Thracian kings (some of them possibly non-Odrysian) are included as well. Odrysian kings, though called Kings of Thrace, never exercised sovereignty over all of Thrace. Control varied according to tribal relationships. Odrysian kings (names are presented in Greek or Latin forms):

- Teres I, son of ? Odryses, (480/450–430 BC)
- Sparatocus, son of Teres I (c. 465?-by 431 BC)
- Sitalces, son of Teres I (by 431–424 BC)
- Seuthes I, son of Sparatocus (424–396 BC)
- Maesades, father of Seuthes II, local ruler in eastern Thrace
- Teres II, local ruler in eastern Thrace
- Metocus (= ? Amadocus I), son of ? Sitalces
- Amadocus I, son of ? Metocus (unless identical to him) or of Sitalces (410–390 BC)
- Seuthes II, son of Maesades, descendant of Teres I, king in southern districts (405–391 BC)
- Hebryzelmis, son or brother of ? Seuthes I (390–384 BC)
- Cotys I, son of ? Seuthes I or Seuthes II (384–359 BC)
- Cersobleptes, son of Cotys I, king in eastern Thrace (359-341 BC)
- Berisades, rival of Cersobleptes, king in western Thrace in Strimos (359–352 BC)
- Amadocus II, rival of Cersobleptes, king in central Thrace in Chersonese & Maroneia (359–351 BC)
- Cetriporis, son of Berisades, king in western Thrace in Strimos (358–347 BC)
- Teres III, son of ? Amadocus II, king in central Thrace in Chersonese & Maroneia (351–342 BC)
- Seuthes III, rebel against Macedonian rule (by 324–after 312)
- Roigos, son of Seuthes (III?) (early 3rd century BC ?)
- The survival of a specifically "Odrysian" state beyond the early 3rd century BC is considered debatable.
- Cotys IV, son of Seuthes V (by 171-after 166 BC), last king described explicitly as Odrysian in the sources.

== Odrysian Kings: a possible family tree ==
Odryses; KINGS OF ODRYSIANS
Teres I
Sitalces	Sparatocos	Maisades
Amadocus I/Metocus	Teres II	Seuthes I ∞ Stratonice of Macedon	Seuthes II
Amadocus II	Hebryzelmis	Cotys I (Odrysian)	(daughter) ∞ Xenophon general	(daughter) ∞ Thrasybulus general
Teres III	Cersobleptes	(daughter) ∞ Iphicrates general	Seuthes III ∞ Gonimase ∞ Berenike of Macedon	(daughter) ∞ Charidemus mercenary leader	Berisades
Iolaus; Poseidonius; Medistas; Teres	Cotys II (Odrysian) in eastern Thrace	Teres IV in inner Thrace	Roigos; Reboulas; Teres; Hebryzelmis; Satocus; Sadalas	Cetriporis
Raizdos in eastern Thrace	Seuthes IV in inner Thrace
Cotys III (Odrysian) in eastern Thrace	Roigos in inner Thrace	Teres V in inner Thrace
Rhescuporis I (Odrysian) in eastern Thrace	Seuthes V in inner Thrace
Amatokos III in inner Thrace	Cotys IV in inner Thrace ∞ Semestra
Teres VI in inner Thrace	Dyegilos king of Caeni ∞ Apama of Bithynia	Bithys in inner Thrace; BRANCH OF; ASTAEAN KINGS
Sotimos king of Maedi ∞ Athenais of Pergamum	Cotys V of Astaean

- Seuthes II maybe father of Cotys I
- Teres II/ΙΙΙ maybe father of Seuthes III
- Cersoblepres maybe father of Seuthes III
- Roigos, son of Seuthes III, maybe king Roigos, son of Seuthes IV
- Raizdos maybe identical to Roigos

== Odrysian treasures ==
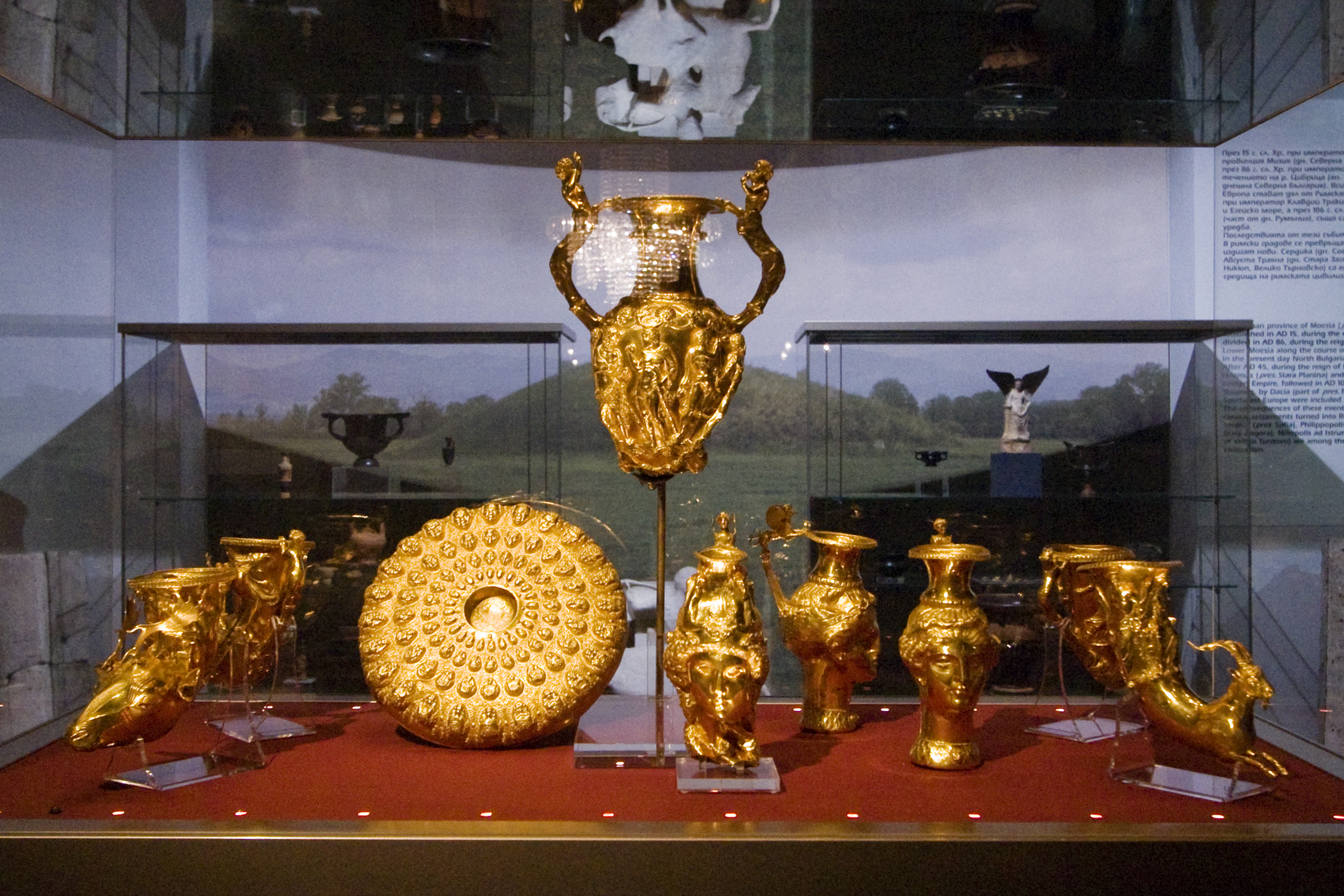
Panagyurishte Treasure

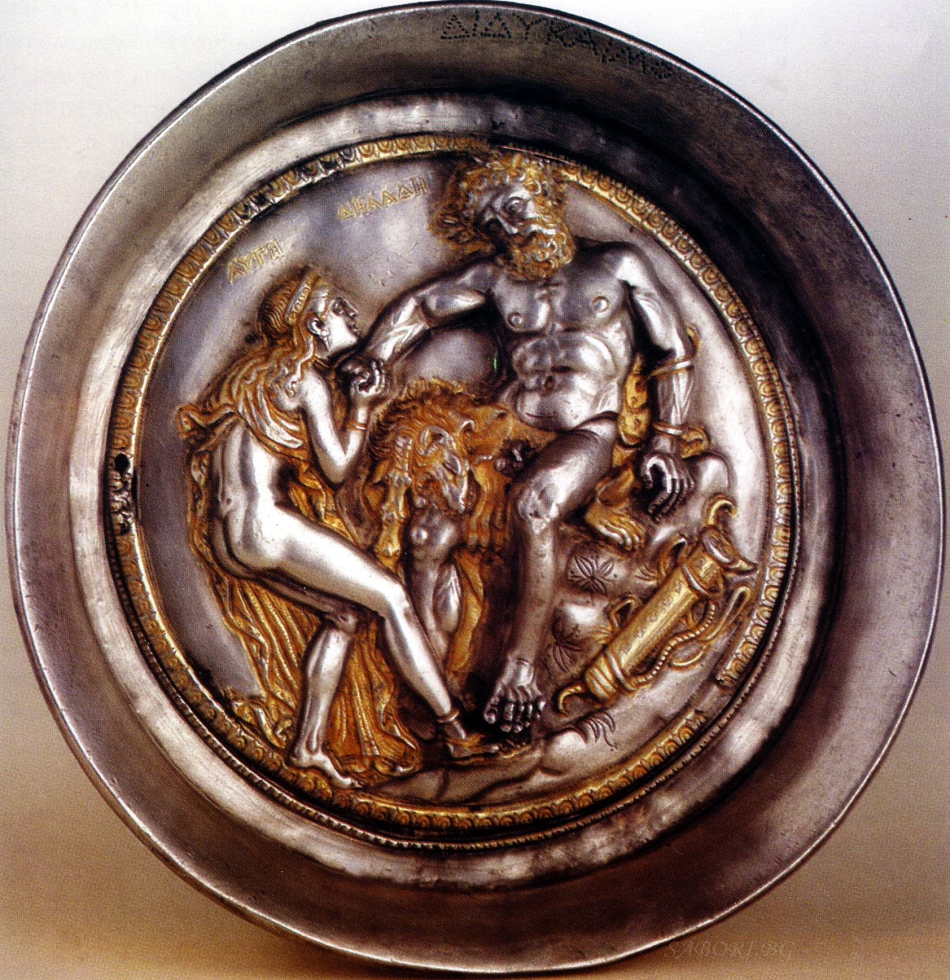
Rogozen Treasure

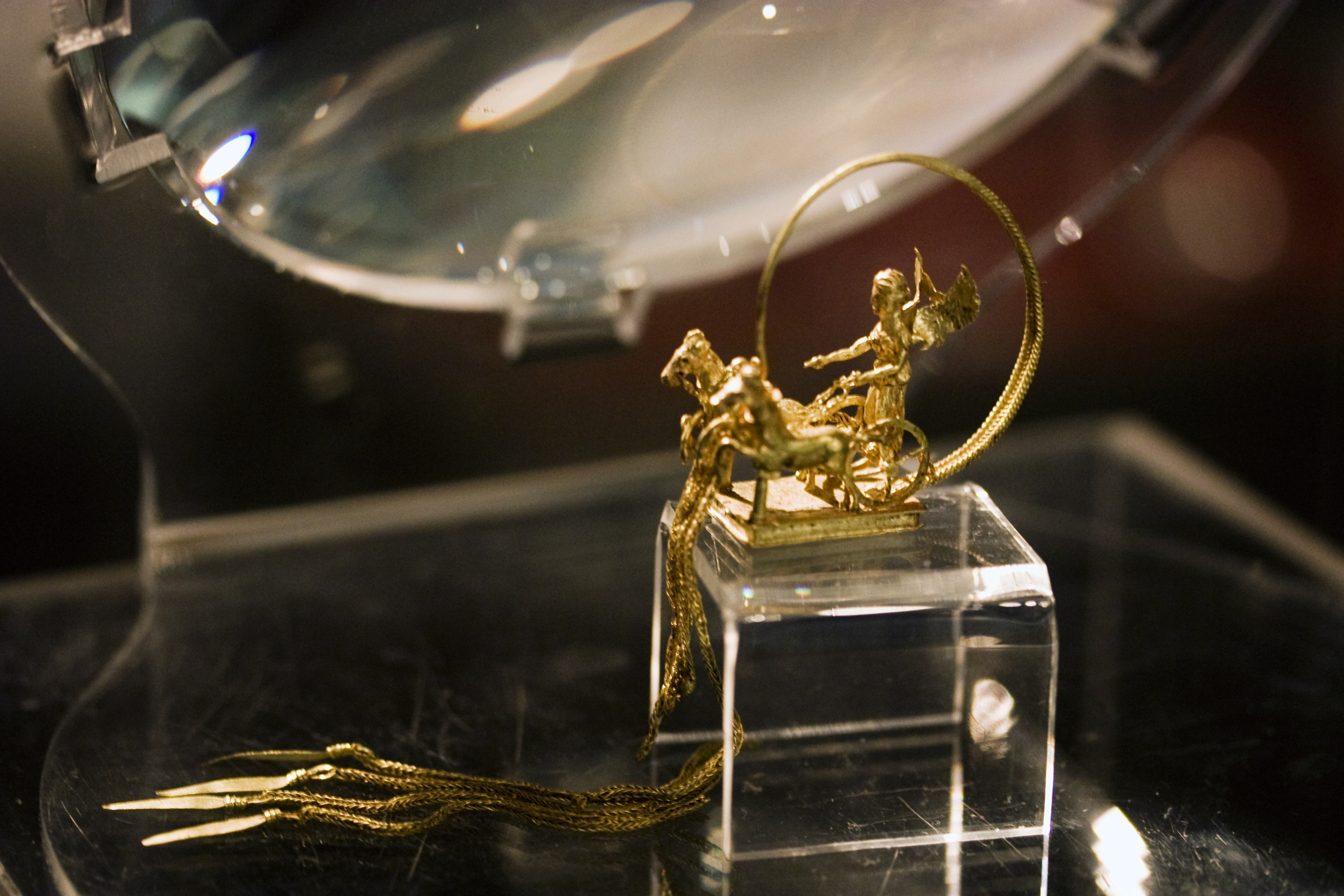
Sinemorets Gold figurines

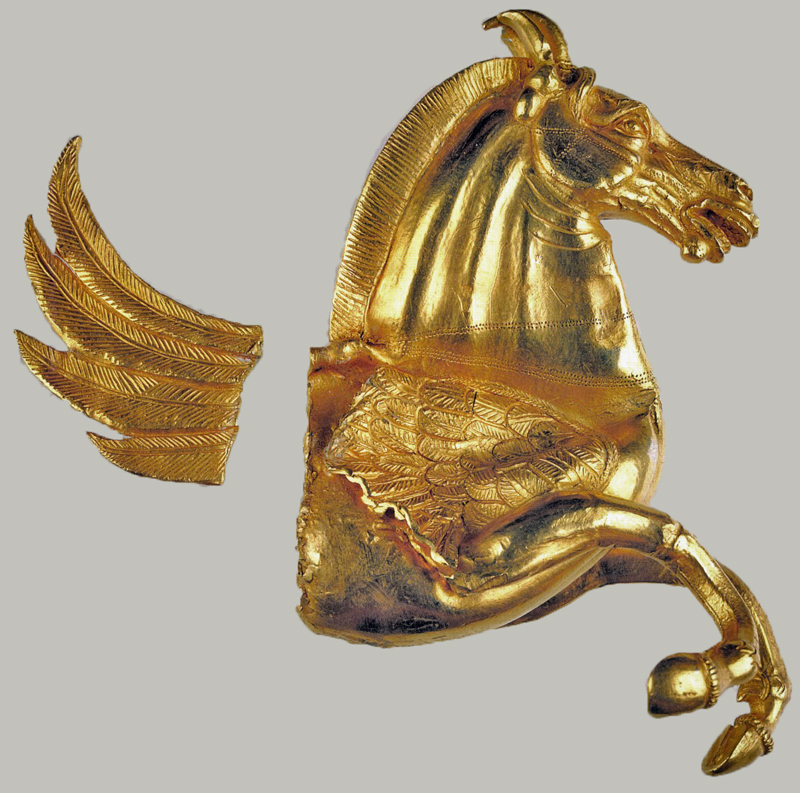
Vazovo Thracian Pegasus

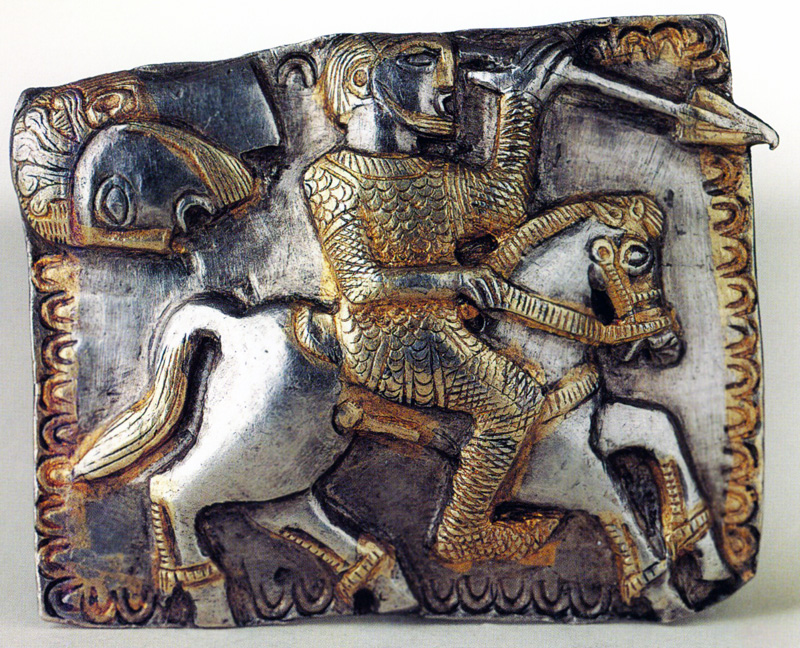
Letnitsa treasure

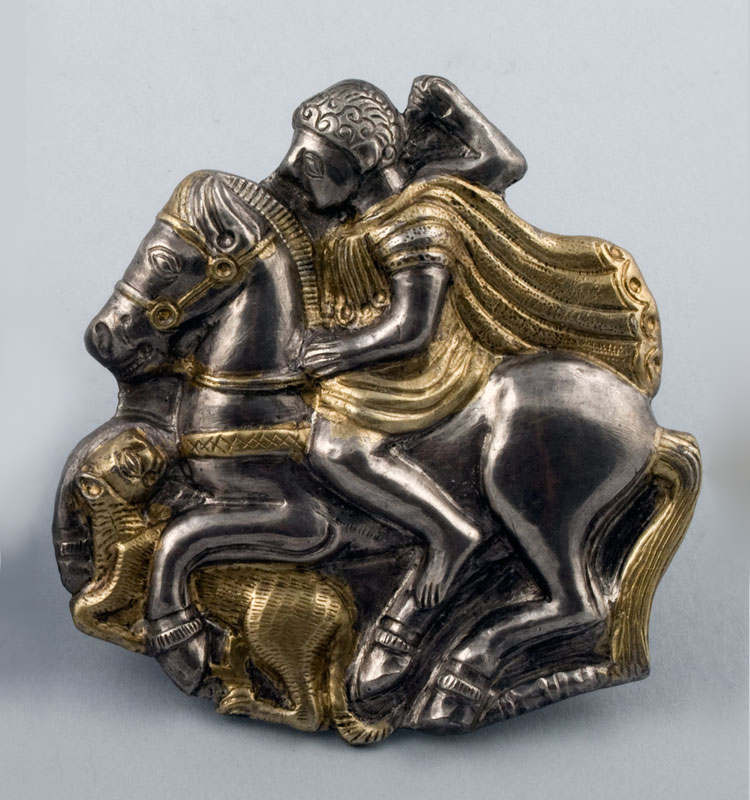
Lukovit Treasure

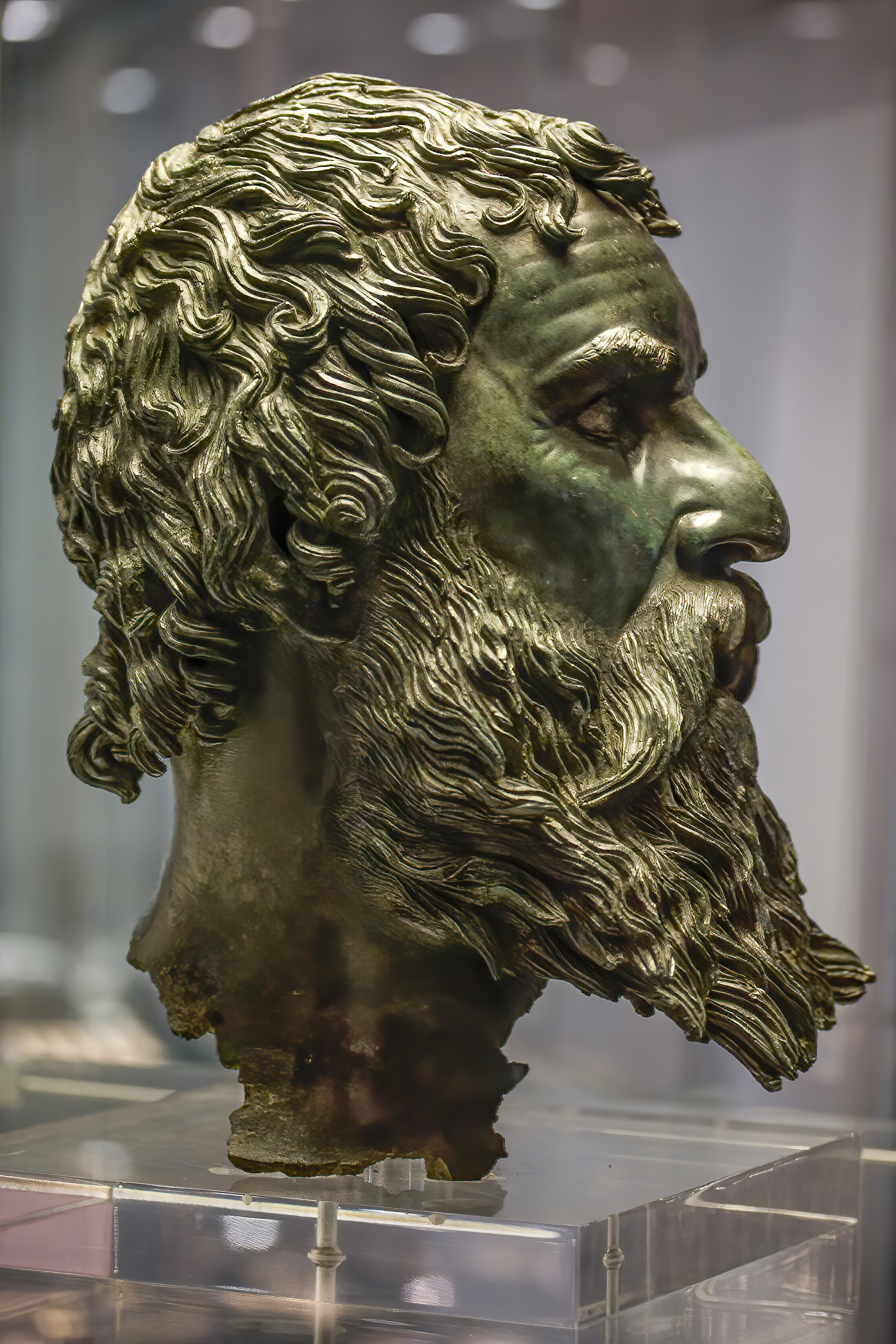
Bronze Head probably of Seuthes III found in Golyamata Kosmatka

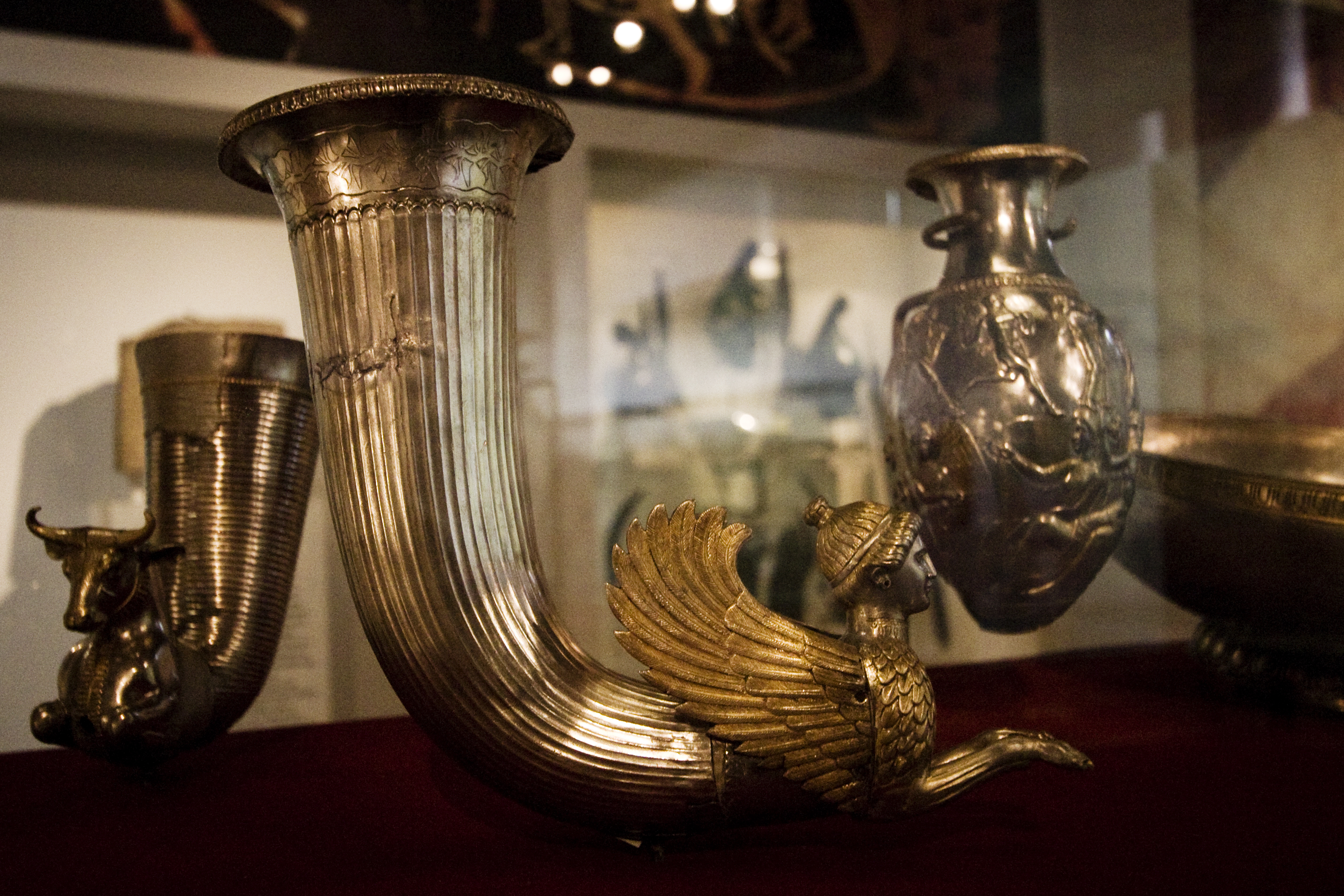
King Cotys I's Borovo Treasure

== See also ==
- List of kings of Thrace and Dacia
