= Seuthes IV =

King of Odrysia (3rd century BC)

Seuthes IV (Ancient Greek: Σεύθης, Seuthēs) was a possible king of the Odrysians in Thrace during the 3rd century BC. Seuthes IV is an obscure figure, and the little that is known depends on inference from very limited information that may apply to him or others of the same name. Roigos, son of Seuthes, buried in the Kazanlăk Tomb, may be identified as the son of Seuthes IV, if Roigos and his tomb date to the mid-3rd century BC (as originally reported); if, on the other hand, Roigos belongs in the early 3rd century BC, he could be identified as an otherwise unattested son of Seuthes III instead. In 2007, the Bulgarian archaeologist Georgi Kitov and his team excavated a Thracian burial mound known as Dalakova Mogila near the village of Topolčane near Sliven. The burial was of a royal or aristocratic warrior, buried in relative hurry with military equipment including an arrow-pierced silver helmet, a golden pectoral, various other vessels, many of them of gold, and a gold ring bearing the inscription that was eventually determined to read "Seuthes son of Teres" (in unusual orthography, ΣΗΥΣΑ ΤΗΡΗΤΟΣ) alongside a depiction of the owner as a bearded mature man with a possibly receding hairline. The date of the burial is uncertain. If it belongs to the 5th century BC, the Seuthes in question could be a son of the obscure Teres II, who was a contemporary of Seuthes II's father Maesades. A 4th-century BC date could make the Seuthes of the ring a son of Teres III, but he appears to be distinct from the famous Seuthes III who appears to have been buried elsewhere. An early 3rd-century BC date could make this Seuthes the son of Seuthes III's son Teres.

== See also ==
- List of Thracian tribes
