= Teres II =

King of the Odrysian kingdom (ruling from 351 to 341 BC)

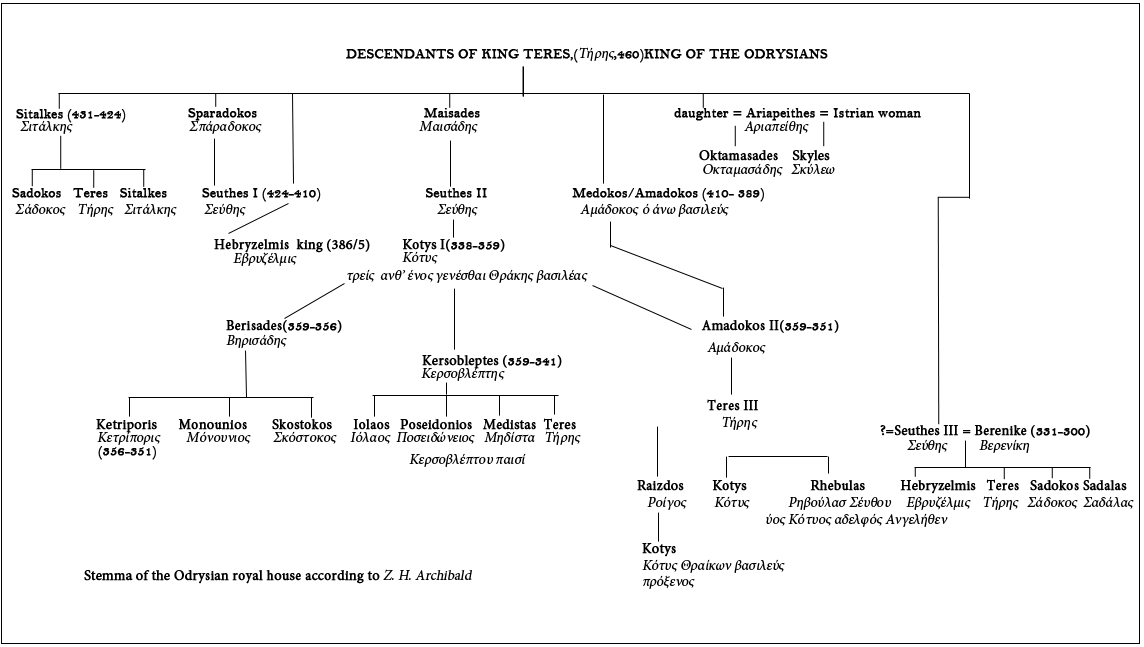

Teres II or Teres III (Ancient Greek: Τήρης, romanized: Tḗrēs) was a king of the Odrysians in Thrace from 351 BC to 341 BC.

The variation in numbering indicates disagreement among scholars, some of whom include as Teres II the paradynast of Amadocus I and rival of Seuthes II who ruled near Byzantium in c. 400 BC, since that Teres is specifically called an Odrysian, and since Seuthes II himself was also a paradynast. The present Teres is therefore found variously as "Teres II" or "Teres III" in the literature.

Teres II or III is generally assumed to have been the son of Amadocus II, on the basis of historical succession and coin types. This identification is possibly supported by an inscription naming "Tērēs (son) of Amatokos" on a silver bowl found at the village of Braničevo in northeastern Bulgaria. Amadocus II, who ruled the central portion of Thrace, disappears from the sources at the time of a military intervention by Philip II of Macedon in 352/351 BC, and Teres appears to have succeeded him at this point. Since Demosthenes stated that Philip had "expelled some kings and replaced them with others," Teres may have come to the throne as Philip's appointee, although Demosthenes' statement is usually associated with the heirs of Berisades in western Thrace. During a subsequent Macedonian campaign in Thrace under Philip's general Antipater in 347/346 BC, Teres kept his throne, apparently allying with Philip against the eastern Thracian king Cersobleptes. This state of affairs lasted until Philip's later and more prolonged campaign in Thrace in 342–340 BC. After several victories over the Thracians, Philip subjugated the country, deposing both Teres and Cersobleptes, presumably in 341 BC.

On the basis of coin distribution and other circumstantial evidence, Teres has been identified as a kinsman (father?) and precursor of the later king Seuthes III, one of whose sons was also named Teres.

== See also ==
- List of Thracian tribes

Teres II Odrysian kingdom of Thrace Born: Unknown Died: Unknown
Preceded by Amadocus II	King of Thrace; 351–341 BC	Succeeded by ? Seuthes III
