= Thracian clothing =

Costume of Thracians and Dacians in the Ancient World

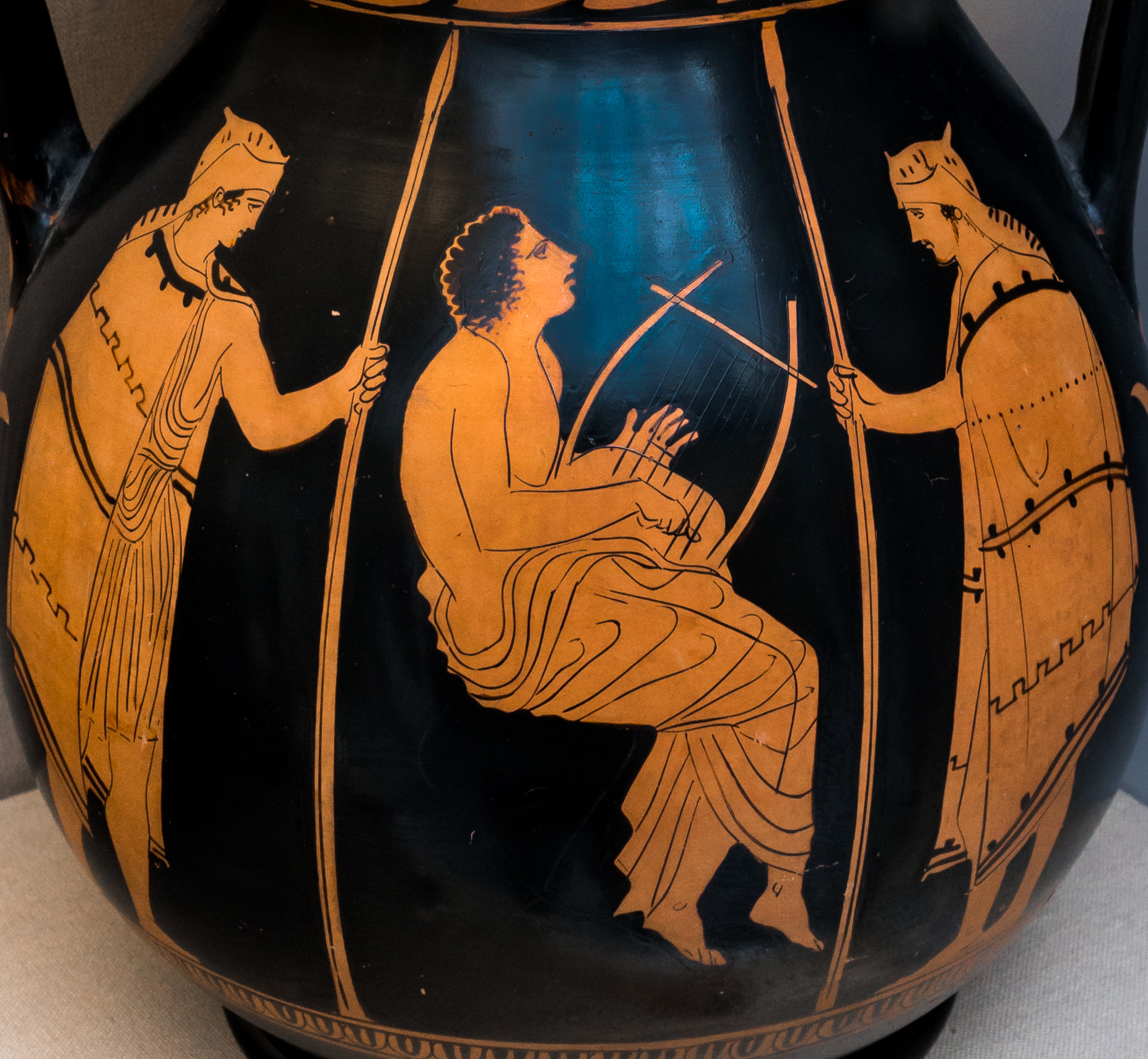
The legendary Thracian bard Orpheus playing the lyre with two Thracian warriors standing by his side, 430 BC

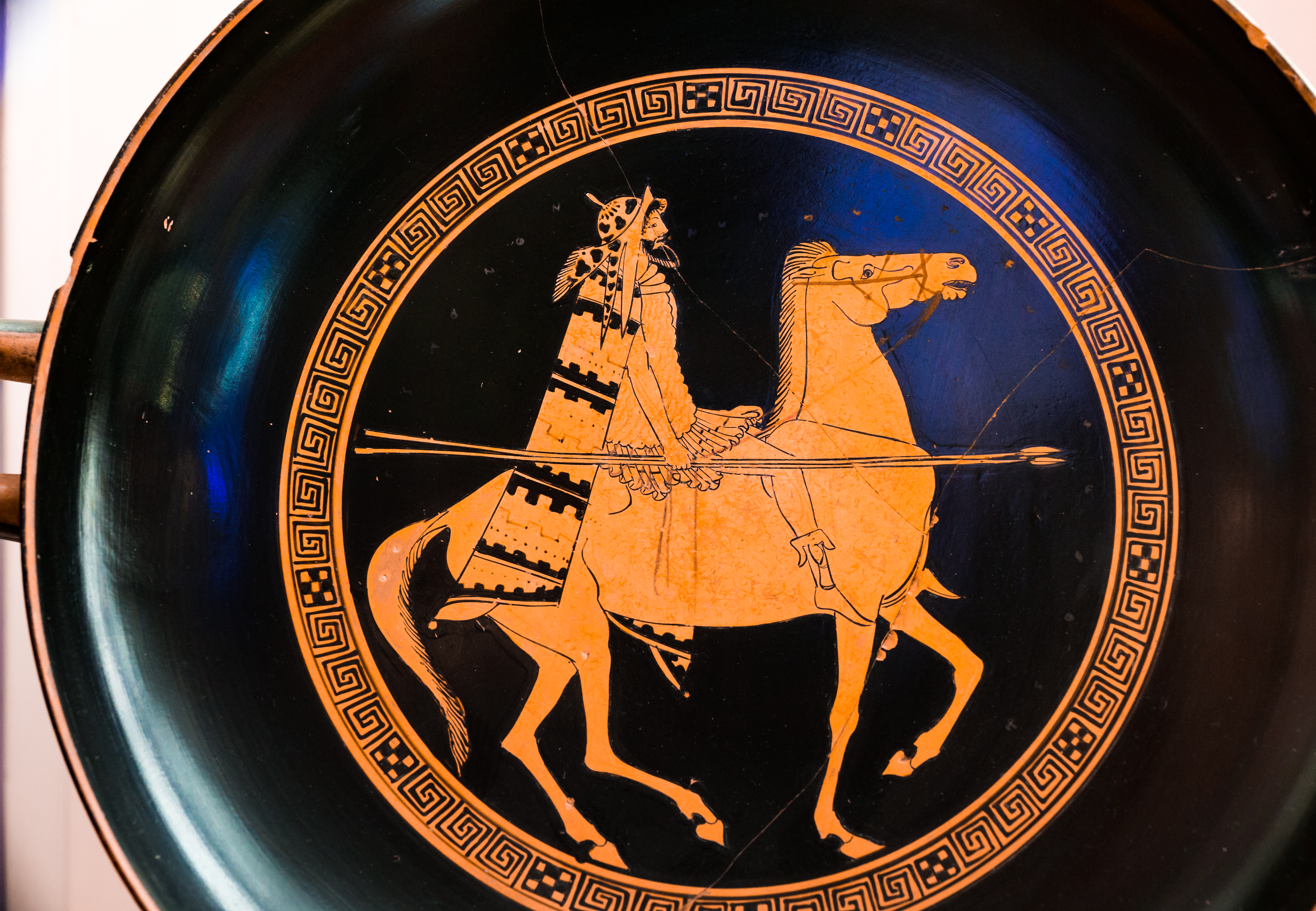
Pottery Artwork of a mounted Thracian Cavalryman, 5th century BC

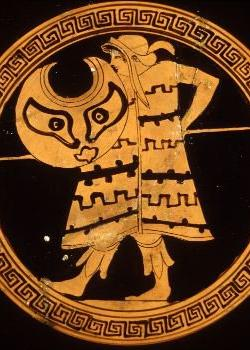
Thracian peltast from a kylix wearing patterned clothing

Thracian clothing refers to types of clothing worn mainly by Thracians, Dacians but also by some Greeks. Its best literal descriptions are given by Herodotus and Xenophon in his Anabasis. Depictions are found in a great number of Greek vases and there are a few Persian representations as well. In contrast to shapes and patterns we have very little evidence on the colours used.

== History and types ==
The Thracians wore a tunic, a cloak called zeira (Ancient Greek: ζείρα), a cap called alopekis (Ancient Greek: αλωπεκίς) made from the scalp of a fox with the ears visible, other Phrygian cap styles, and fawnskin boots called embades (Ancient Greek: εμβάδες). Thracian clothing was sometimes decorated with intricate patterns. Clothing was made from hemp, flax or wool. The Dacians and the Getae wore pantaloons, which the Romans would later call braccae (Ancient Greek: ἀναξυρίδες or θύλακοι).These loose pants were described in Euripides work as “variegated bags” (Ancient Greek: τοὺς θυλάκους τοὺς ποικίλους) and may have appeared highly ridiculous to the Greeks, although Ovid mentions the adoption of them by the descendants of some of the Greek colonists on the Euxine.These trousers were common in many nations.

=== Classical era ===
In the north only noble Thracians, the "Zibythides" and noble Dacians, the "Pileati", would wear caps. Despite this Herodotus writes that all Thracians in the Persian army wore foxskin caps and multicoloured mantles. Northern tribes in general, both Thracians and Daco-Getians, wore clothes similar to Scythians.

=== Hellenistic era ===
The Thracians at Pydna in 168 BC wore black tunics. The Kausia (Ancient Greek: Καυσία) was adopted from the Macedonians. Although many Thracian tribes began to incorporate Greek garbs to their fashion, they still largely retained their own styles of clothing.

== See also ==
- Clothing in the ancient world
- Dacian bracelets
