= Amatokos III =

Odrysian king in ancient Thrace

Amatokos III (Ancient Greek: Αμάδοκος) was king of the Odrysian kingdom of Thrace.

== See also ==
- List of Thracian tribes

Amatokos III
Odrysian kingdom of Thrace
Born: Unknown Died: Unknown
