= List of Dacian plant names =

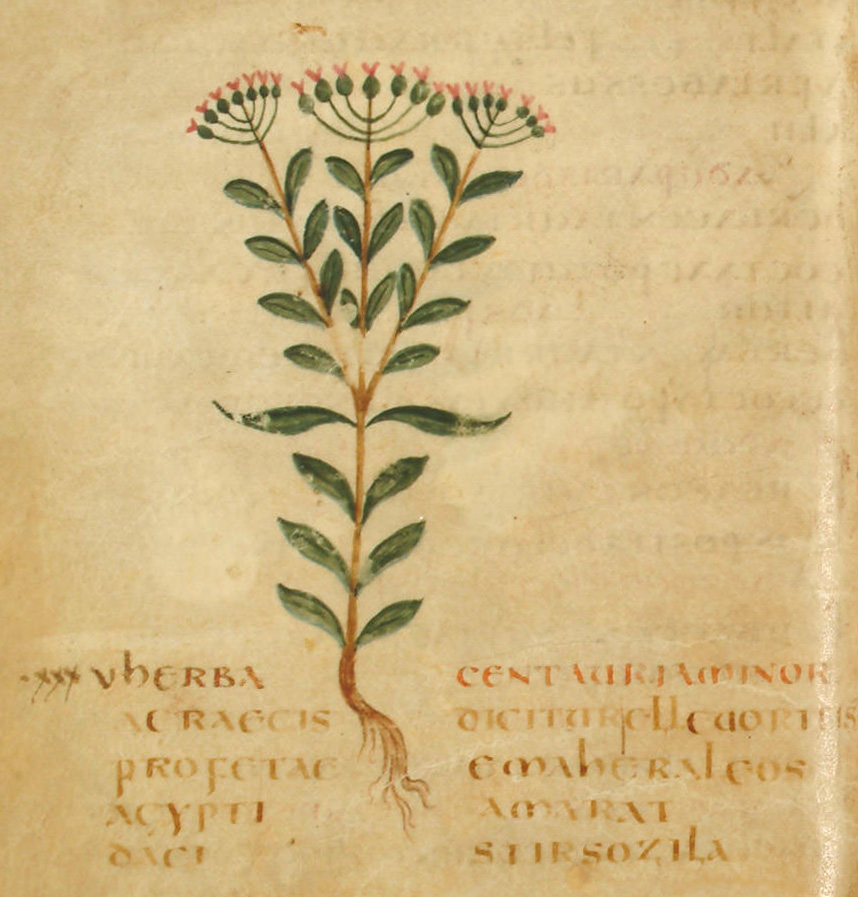
Centaury, Stirsozila in Dacian language, as depicted in 6th-century Leiden manuscript of Pseudo-Apuleius' Herbarius

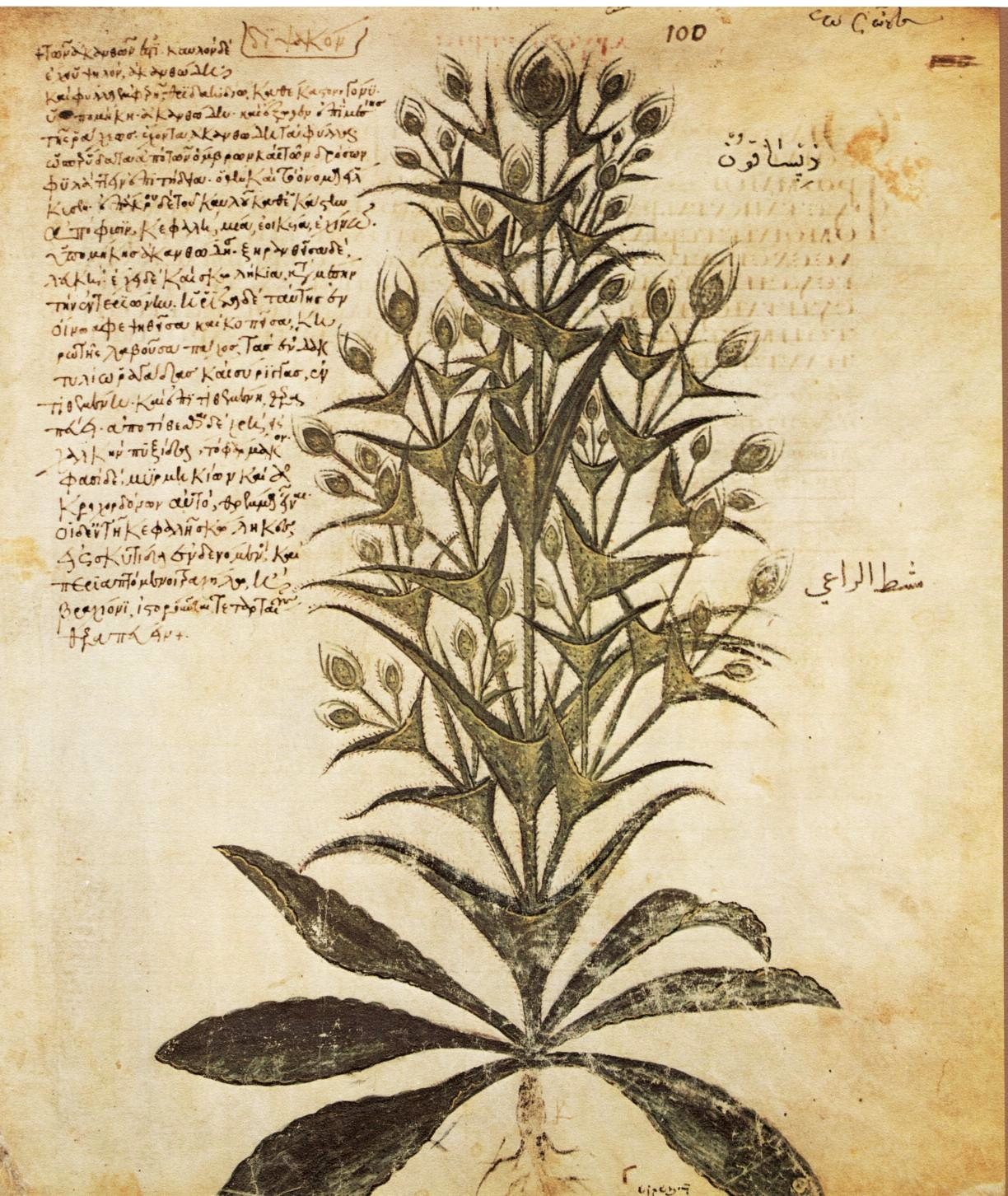
Skiare, Dacian for Wild Teasel, depicted in 6th-century Vienna manuscript of Dioscorides' De Materia Medica

This is a list of plant names in Dacian, surviving from ancient botanical works such as Dioscorides' De Materia Medica (abb. MM) and Pseudo-Apuleius' Herbarius (abb. Herb.). Dacian plant names are one of the primary sources left to us for studying the Dacian language, an ancient language of South Eastern Europe. This list also includes a Bessian plant name and a Moesian plant name, both neighboring Daco-Thracian tribes, as well as a clear Albanoid name. According to linguist Vladimir I. Georgiev, the suffixes -dela, -dil(l)a, -zila and -tilia indicate names of medicinal plants.

| Dacian | English | Botanical | Notes |
|---|---|---|---|
| Adila | 1. Bistort; 2. Arum | 1. Persicaria bistorta, also classified as Polygonum bistorta 2. Arum maculatum | 1. primary source for this meaning as yet unidentified 2. Herb., 14; Per Georgiev, from *aydʰ-ilo 'burning' > 'red'. |
| Amalusta, Amolusta, or Amulusta | Chamomile | Matricaria recutita or Anthemis tinctoria | Herb. 23; possibly related to Albanian ëmbël, ambël "sweet". *lustu appears as a proto-Celtic word for "plant". |
| Aniarsexe, Aniassexie | Sainfoin a.k.a. Cockshead | Onobrychis caput-galii | |
| Aprus | Gladwin iris | Iris foetidissima | |
| Arpopria, Arborria | Climbing Ivy | Hedera helix | |
| Asa | Coltsfoot | Tussilago farfara | also a Bessian plant name. |
| Aurumetti, Aurimetellum | Cranesbill a.k.a. crowsfoot or wild geranium ? | Geranium sylvaticum or Ranunculus sardous? | MM 2.175, Herb. 67 |
| Azila | Houndstongue | Cynoglossum | Probably a variant of Usazila (see below) |
| Bles, Blis | Purple Amaranth | Amaranthus blitum | |
| Budalla, Budama, Budathala, Budathla | Anchusa | Anchusa italica | Per Georgiev, Boudathla corresponds to bou-glosson 'ox's tongue'; from *gʷṓw-dn̥ǵʰ(w-e)lä 'ox-tongue'. |
| Caropithla, Karopithla | 1. Yellow serradella 2. Common Polypody | 1. Ornithopus compressus 2. Polypodium vulgare | |
| Cercer, Cerceraphron, Kerker, Kerkeraphron | Pimpernel | Anagallis | |
| Chodela, Khodela | Ground Pine | Lycopodium (Lycopodium clavatum or Lycopodium annotitum / Lycopodium dubium?) | |
| Cinouboila, Cinuboila, Kinouboila, Kinuboila | 1. Wild pumpkin 2. White bryony 3. White grape | 1. Cucurbita foetidissima 2. Bryonia alba 3. Vitis | a compound of kinu "dog" and oboila "apple", akin to Lithuanian šúnobuolas "wild pumpkin", Thracian dinupula, sinupyla "id". Per Georgiev, literally "hound's apple". |
| Coadama, Koadama | Pondweed | Potamogeton zosteraefolium | |
| Coicolida, Koikolida | Nightshade | Atropa belladonna | the first element koiko means "one-eyed" or "blind", and is akin to Latin caecus "blind", Irish caoch "one-eyed", Goth haihs "one-eyed", Sanskrit kekara "squint-eyed" |
| Cotiata, Kotiata | Switchgrass | Panicum dactylum | also refers to genus Agropyron? |
| Courionnecum, Couriounnecum, Curiounnecum, Kourionnekoum | Arum | Arum | |
| Coustane, Croustane, Crustane, Custane, Koustane, Kroustane, Krustane, Kustane | Greater celandine or Lesser celandine | Chelidonium majus or Ranunculus ficaria | |
| Cycolis, Kykolis | Groundcherry or Ashwagandha | Physalis sp. or Withania somnifera | |
| Dacina, Dakina | 1. Beet; 2. False helleborine | 1. Beta vulgaris 2. Veratrum nigrum | the Moesian name for these plants was Mendruta (see below) |
| Dicotella | White bryony | Bryonia alba | |
| Diellina, Dielina, Dielleina, Diellena | Henbane | Hyoscyamus niger | a Proto-Albanoid term, with a clear etymological connection to Albanian dielli ("sun") < PAlb. *dðiella < *dziella- < EPAlb. *ȷ́élu̯a- < PIE *ǵʰélh₃u̯o- "yellow, golden, bright/shiny". |
| Diesapter | Mullein | Verbascum | Georgiev argued that the word contains the stem *dies 'light, day', also present in Diesema. |
| Diessathel | Wavyleaf mullein | Verbascum sinuatum | from IE *diwes-sētlo; where the second element meant "sieve" (cf. Old Norse sáld "sieve", Welsh hidl "strainer", Lithuanian sėkla "seed", Greek ēthein "to strain", Old Church Slavonic sito) |
| Diesema | Mullein | Verbascum | from IE *diyes eusmn. "burning sky" (cf. Latin dies "day", Greek heúein "to burn") and similar to German Himmelbrand "mullein", literally "burning heavens". |
| Diodela, Duodela, Duodella, Ziodela | 1. Yarrow?; 2. Chamomile; 3. Sweet Marjoram | 1. Achillea millefolium?; 2. Matricaria recutita 3. Origanum majorana | |
| Dracontos | Rosemary | Rosmarinus officinalis | |
| Dokela | Bugle | Ajuga iva | |
| Dyn | Nettle | Urtica | |
| Ebustrone | Lesser celandine | Ranunculus ficaria | From Pseudo-Apuleis |
| Gonoleta, Gouoleta, Guoleta, Guolete | Gromwell | Lithospermum tenuiflorum | Consumed as an oral contraceptive |
| Hormea, Hormia | Annual clary | Salvia horminum | |
| Lax | Purslane | Portulaca oleracea | Used as a laxative |
| Manteia, Mantia | Woolly blackberry | Rubus tomentosus | related to Albanian man "mulberry" |
| Mendruta | 1. Beet; 2. False helleborine | 1. Beta vulgaris 2. Veratrum nigrum | Actually, a Moesian plant name |
| Mizela, Mizila, Mozula, Mouzula | Thyme | Thymus | |
| Nemenepsa | Ground Pine | Lycopodium | |
| Olma | Dwarf elder, Danewort | Sambucus ebulus | |
| Parithia, Parthia | Dog's Tooth Grass | Cynodon ? | |
| Pegrina | White bryony | Bryonia alba | |
| Phithophthethela | Maidenhair fern | Adiantum | |
| Polpum | Dill | Anethum graveolens | |
| Priadela, Priadila | White Bryony or Black bryony | Bryonia alba or Tamus communis | |
| Probedula, Procedila, Propedila, Propedula, Propodila | Creeping Cinquefoil | Potentilla reptans | Procedila< Prokedila, probably a scribal error for *Probedila, a graphic confusion between β/κ being rather common in Greek manuscripts. Compare to the Gaulish name for this plant, Pempedula (five-leaved). |
| Prodiarna, Prodiorna | Black Hellebore | Helleborus niger | |
| Rathibida | Italian aster | Aster amellus | |
| Riborasta | Burdock | Arctium | |
| Salia | 1. Anise; 2. Stinking Tutsan | 1. Pimpinella tragium 2. Hypericum hircunum | |
| Seba | Elderberry | Sambucus | Georgiev equated it to Lithuanian šeivà. |
| Skiare | Wild Teasel | Dipsacus sylvestris or Dipsacus fullonum | |
| Skinpoax, Sipoax, Spioax | Broadleaf Plantain | Plantago major | |
| Sikupnoex, Sikupnux | Eryngo | Eryngium campestre | |
| Stirsozila | Centaury | Centaurium erythraea, formerly classified as Erythraea centaurium | from Pseudo-Apuleis |
| Tanidila | Catmint | Nepeta | |
| Teudila | Peppermint or Horsemint or Calamint? | Mentha x piperita or Mentha sylvestris or Calamintha? | |
| Troutrastra, Trutrastra, Tutrastra | 1. Pumpkin; 2. Colocynth | 1. Cucurbita; 2. Citrullus colocynthis | |
| Toulbela, Tulbela | Centaury | Centaurium erythraea | |
| Usazila | Hound's Tongue | Cynoglossum | Probably a variant of Azila (see above) |
| Zena | Poison Hemlock | Conium maculatum | |
| Zired | Redstem Wormwood | Artemisia scoparia | |
| Zououster, Zuste, Zuuster | Wormwood | Artemisia arborescens or campestris | |

== See also ==
- Dacian language
- List of Dacian words
- List of Romanian words of possible pre-Roman origin
- List of Dacian names
