= Dacian language =

Extinct Indo-European language of the Carpathian region

Dacian
- Native to: Dacia
- Region: modern-day Romania, northern Bulgaria, eastern Serbia; Moldova, southwestern Ukraine, southeastern Slovakia, southern Poland, northeastern Hungary
- Ethnicity: Dacians
- Extinct: 6th century AD
- Language family: Indo-European: Daco-Thracian (?); Dacian
- Writing system: Latin, Greek (limited use)

Language codes
- ISO 639-3: xdc
- Glottolog: daci1234

Dacian (/ˈdeɪʃən/) is an extinct language generally believed to be a member of the Indo-European language family that was spoken in the ancient region of Dacia.

The Dacian language is poorly documented. Unlike Phrygian, which is documented by c. 200 inscriptions, only one Dacian inscription is believed to have survived. The Dacian names for a number of medicinal plants and herbs may survive in ancient literary texts, including about 60 plant-names in Dioscorides. About 1,150 personal names and 900 toponyms may also be of Dacian origin. Of about 100 Dacian words reconstructed through 20th century comparative linguistics techniques, only 20–25 had achieved wide acceptance by 1982.

== Sources ==
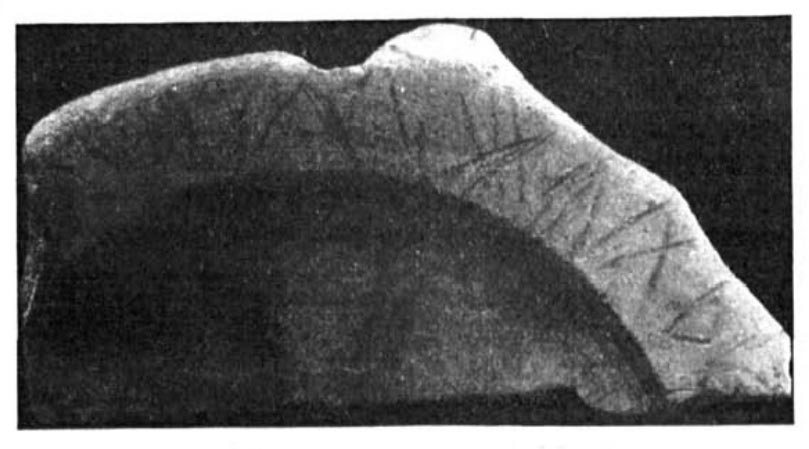
A fragment of a vase collected by Mihail Dimitriu at the site of Poiana, Galați (Piroboridava), Romania illustrating the use of Greek and Latin letters by a Dacian potter (source: Dacia journal, 1933)

Many characteristics of the Dacian language are disputed or unknown. No lengthy texts in Dacian exist, only a few glosses and personal names in ancient Greek and Latin texts of the Roman era. No Dacian-language inscriptions have been discovered, except some of names in the Latin or Greek alphabet. What is known about the language derives from:

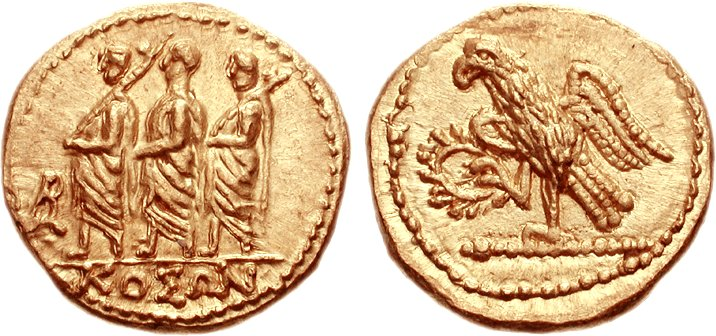
Gold stater coin found in Dacia. Obverse: Roman magistrate with lictors. Legend ΚΟΣΩΝ (Coson) and (left centre) monogram BR or OΛB. Reverse: Eagle clutching laurel-wreath. Probably minted in a Greek Black sea city (Olbia?), commissioned by a Thracian or Getan king (Cotiso? Koson?) or by a high Roman official (Brutus?), in honour of the other. Late 1st century BC

- Placenames, river-names and personal names, including the names of kings. The coin inscription KOΣON (Koson) may also be a personal name, of the king who issued the coin.
- The Dacian names of about fifty plants written in Greek and Roman sources (see List of Dacian plant names). Etymologies have been established for only a few of them.

Some scholars have used the substratum words found in Romanian, the language that is spoken today in most of the region once occupied by Dacian-speakers, to reconstruct Dacian words. According to Romanian historian Ion I. Russu, there are supposedly over 160 Romanian words of Dacian origin, representing, together with derivates, 10% of the basic Romanian vocabulary; however, many linguists consider them debatable. Romanian words for which a Dacian origin has been proposed include: balaur ("dragon"), brânză ("cheese"), mal ("bank, shore"), and strugure ("grape"). The value of the Romanian words of possible pre-Roman origin as a source for the Dacian language is limited because there is no certainty that these are of Dacian origin. Some of them may be actually inherited from Latin (e.g., melc ("snail") may derive from Latin limax/proto-Romance *limace; cf. It. lumaca, by metathesis of "m" with "l"), and others are clear loanwords from Albanian (e.g. Romanian vatră < Tosk Albanian vatër). The methodology that reconstructs Dacian words using Romanian words of pre-Roman origin that also have cognates in Albanian, but which have not been attested to be Dacian or which have not been documented in Dacian territory is speculatively based on the unproven theory that Dacian constitutes the main linguistic substratum of Romanian and a closely related language to Albanian, a circular method criticised by mainstream historical linguistics.

The substratum words have been used, in some cases, to corroborate Dacian words reconstructed from place- and personal names, e.g., Dacian *balas = "white" (from personal name Balius), Romanian bălan = "white-haired" However, even in this case, it cannot be determined with certainty whether the Romanian word derives from the presumed Dacian word or from its Old Slavic cognate belu.

== Origin ==
There is scholarly consensus that Dacian was a member of the Indo-European family of languages. These descended, according to the two leading theories of the expansion of IE languages, from a proto-Indo-European (PIE) language that originated in an urheimat ("original homeland") in the southern Ukraine/ Caucasus region (Kurgan hypothesis) or in central Anatolia (Anatolian hypothesis). According to both theories, Indo-European reached the Carpathian region no later than c. 2500 BC.

According to one scenario, proto-Thracian populations emerged during the Bronze Age from the fusion of the indigenous Eneolithic (Chalcolithic) population with the intruders of the transitional Indo-Europeanization Period. From these proto-Thracians, in the Iron Age, developed the Dacians / North Thracians of the Danubian-Carpathian Area on the one hand and the Thracians of the eastern Balkan Peninsula on the other.

According to Georgiev, the Dacian language was spread south of the Danube by tribes from Carpathia, who reached the central Balkans in the period 2000–1000 BC, with further movements (e.g., the Triballi tribe) after 1000 BC, until c. 300 BC.

== Linguistic classification ==
The scantly documented material of Dacian shows that it was an Indo-European language (IE), but it is not sufficient to allow a clear classification of Dacian among the IE branches. As such, there are divergent opinions about its place within the IE family:

- Dacian and the extinct Thracian language as members of a single dialect continuum; e.g., Baldi (1983) and Trask (2000).
- Dacian as a language distinct from Thracian but closely related to it, belonging to the same branch of the Indo-European family (a "Thraco-Dacian", or "Daco-Thracian" branch has been theorised by some linguists).
- Dacian, Thracian, the Baltic languages (Duridanov also adds Pelasgian) as a distinct branch of Indo-European, e.g., Schall (1974), Duridanov (1976), Radulescu (1987) and Mayer (1996).
- Dacian as a language of the "Daco-Moesian" group that would have also included the ancestor of the Albanian language spoken south of the Danube in Upper Moesia. The "Daco-Moesian" branch would have been other than that of Thracian, but closely related to Thracian and distinct from Illyrian. Proposed by Georgiev (1977), this view has not gained wide acceptance among scholars and is rejected by most linguists, who consider that Albanian belongs to the Illyrian branch of IE, either as a direct descendant or as a sister language.

Several linguists classify Dacian as a satem IE language: Russu, Rădulescu, Katičić and Križman. In Crossland's opinion (1982), both Thracian and Dacian feature one of the main satem characteristics, the change of Indo-European *k and *g to s and z. But the other characteristic satem changes are doubtful in Thracian and are not evidenced in Dacian. In any case, the satem/centum distinction, once regarded as a fundamental division between IE languages, is no longer considered as important in historical linguistics by mainstream scholars. It is now recognised that it is only one of many isoglosses in the IE zone; that languages can exhibit both types at the same time, and that these may change over time within a particular language. There is much controversy about the place of Dacian in the IE evolutionary tree. According to a dated view, Dacian derived from a Daco-Thraco-Phrygian (or "Paleo-Balkan") branch of IE. Today, Phrygian is no longer widely seen as linked in this way to Dacian and Thracian.

In contrast, the hypothesis of a Thraco-Dacian or Daco-Thracian branch of IE, indicating a close link between the Thracian and Dacian languages, has numerous adherents, including Russu 1967, Georg Solta 1980, Vraciu 1980, (Note: Rădulescu 1984, p. 85: "Russu's conviction about the existence of a 'Thraco-Dacian Language', shared by Crossland and by Vraciu (1980) and the reservations expressed by Polomé and Katicic (see above) are thus fully justified") Crossland 1982, (Note: Crossland 1982, p. 838: "V. I. Georgiev (1977) has claimed in addition that names from the Dacian and Mysian areas approximately Roman Dacia and Moesia) show different and generally less extensive changes in Indo-European consonants and vowels than do those found in Thrace itself. The evidence seems to indicate divergence of a 'Thraco-Dacian' language into northern and southern groups of dialects, not so different as to rank as separate languages, with the development of special tendencies in word formation and of certain secondary phonetic features in each group") Rădulescu 1984, (Note: Rădulescu 1984, p. 85: "Georgiev had the merit to state that Daco-Moesian possesses a certain degree of dialectal individuality, but the data presented here clearly label as wrong any theory which claims a more profound separation between Daco-Moesian and Thracian proper, even if Daco-Moesian proves to be more closely related to Illyrian than to Thracian or, as it seems more likely to be the case, if we will eventually have to conclude that we deal with three different dialects of the same language") 1987. (Note: Rădulescu 1987, p. 243: "Russu defended two important theses: 1) the close relationship between Daco-Moesian and Thracian (the title of his book is The language of the Thraco- Dacians), and 2) the nonexistence of a "consonantal shift" in Thracian, contrasting it with Daco-Mysian, firmly supporting the position that, in both dialects, the IE *MA and M merged into M and the *T remained unmodified") Mihailov (2008) and Trask 2000. (Note: Trask 2000, p. 343: "...Thracian An extinct and poorly known Indo-European language of ancient Bulgaria and Romania. Its slightly distinct northern variety is sometimes distinguished as Dacian, in which case the label Daco-Thracian is applied to the whole complex ...") The Daco-Thracian theory is ultimately based on the testimony of several Greco-Roman authors: most notably the Roman imperial-era historian and geographer Strabo, who states that the Dacians, Getae, Mysians and Thracians all spoke the same language. Herodotus states that "the Getae are the bravest and the most just amongst the Thracians", linking the Getae with the Thracians. Some scholars also see support for a close link between the Thracian and Dacian languages in the works of Cassius Dio, Trogus Pompeius, Appian and Pliny the Elder.

But the Daco-Thracian theory has been challenged since the 1960s by the Bulgarian linguist Vladimir I. Georgiev and his followers. Georgiev argues, on phonetic, lexical and toponymic grounds, that Thracian, Dacian and Phrygian were completely different languages, each a separate branch of IE, and that no Daco-Thraco-Phrygian or Daco-Thracian branches of IE ever existed. Georgiev argues that the distance between Dacian and Thracian was approximately the same as that between the Armenian and Persian languages, which are completely different languages. In elaborating the phonology of Dacian, Georgiev uses plant-names attested to in Dioscorides and Pseudo-Apuleius, ascertaining their literal meanings, and hence their etymology, using the Greek translations provided by those authors. The phonology of Dacian produced in this way is very different from that of Thracian; the vowel change IE *o > *a recurs and the k-sounds undergo the changes characteristic of the satem languages. For the phonology of Thracian, Georgiev uses the principle that an intelligible placename in a modern language is likely to be a translation of an ancient name.

=== Relationship with ancient languages ===
==== Thracian ====
There is general agreement among scholars that Dacian and Thracian were Indo-European languages; however, widely divergent views exist about their relationship:

1. Dacian was a northern dialect or a slightly distinct variety of the Thracian language. Alternatively, Thracian was a southern dialect of Dacian which developed relatively late. Linguists use the term Daco-Thracian or Thraco-Dacian to denote this presumed Dacian and Thracian common language. On this view, these dialects may have possessed a high degree of mutual intelligibility.
2. Dacian and Thracian were distinct but related languages, descended from a hypothetical Daco-Thracian branch of Indo-European. One suggestion is that the Dacian differentiation from Thracian may have taken place after 1500 BC. In this scenario, the two languages may have possessed only limited mutual intelligibility.
3. Dacian and Thracian were related, constituting separate branches of IE. However, they shared a large number of words, which were mutual borrowings due to long-term geographical proximity. Nevertheless, they would not have been mutually intelligible.

Georgiev (1977) and Duridanov (1985) argue that the phonetic development from proto-Indo-European of the two languages was clearly divergent.

Divergent sound-changes in Paleo-Balkan languages according to Georgiev (1977)
Proto-Indo-European	Dacian	Thracian	Phrygian
*o	a	a	o
*e	ie	e	e
*ew	e	eu	eu
*aw	a	au	
*r̥, *l̥	ri	ur (or), ur (ol)	al
*n̥, *m̥	a	un	an
*b, *d, *g	b, d, g	p, t, k	p, t, k
*p, *t, *k	p, t, k	ph, th, kh	ph, th, kh
*s	s	s	∅
*sw	s	s	w
*sr	str	str	br

Note: Asterisk indicates reconstructed PIE sound. ∅ is a zero symbol (no sound, when the sound has been dropped).

Divergent sound-changes in Dacian and Thracian according to Duridanov (1985)
Indo-European	Dacian	Thracian
*b, *d, *g	b, d, g	p, t, k
*p, *t, *k	p, t, k	ph, th, kh
*ē	ä (a)	ē
*e (after consonant)	ie	e
*ai	a	ai
*ei	e	ei
*dt (*tt)	s	st

Georgiev and Duridanov argue that the phonetic divergences above prove that the Dacian and Thracian (and Phrygian, per Georgiev) languages could not have descended from the same branch of Indo-European, but must have constituted separate, stand-alone branches. However, the validity of this conclusion has been challenged due to a fundamental weakness in the source-material for sound-change reconstruction. Since the ancient Balkan languages never developed their own alphabets, ancient Balkan linguistic elements (mainly placenames and personal names) are known only through their Greek or Latin transcripts. These may not accurately reproduce the indigenous sounds, e.g., Greek and Latin had no dedicated graphic signs for phonemes such as č, ġ, ž, š and others. Thus, if a Thracian or Dacian word contained such a phoneme, a Greek or Latin transcript would not represent it accurately. Because of this, there are divergent and even contradictory assumptions for the phonological structure and development of the Dacian and Thracian languages. This can be seen from the different sound-changes proposed by Georgiev and Duridanov, reproduced above, even though these scholars agree that Thracian and Dacian were different languages. Also, some sound-changes proposed by Georgiev have been disputed, e.g., that IE *T (tenuis) became Thracian TA (tenuis aspiratae), and *M (mediae) = T: it has been argued that in both languages IE *MA (mediae aspiratae) fused into M and that *T remained unchanged. Georgiev's claim that IE *o mutated into a in Thracian, has been disputed by Russu.

A comparison of Georgiev's and Duridanov's reconstructed words with the same meaning in the two languages shows that, although they shared some words, many words were different. However, even if such reconstructions are accepted as valid, an insufficient quantity of words have been reconstructed in each language to establish that they were unrelated.

According to Georgiev (1977), Dacian placenames and personal names are completely different from their Thracian counterparts. However, Tomaschek (1883) and Mateescu (1923) argue that some common elements exist in Dacian and Thracian placenames and personal names, but Polomé considered that research had, by 1982, confirmed Georgiev's claim of a clear onomastic divide between Thrace and Moesia/Dacia.

Georgiev highlighted a striking divergence between placename-suffixes in Dacia/Moesia and Thrace: Daco-Moesian placenames generally carry the suffix -dava (variants: -daba, -deva), meaning "town" or "stronghold". But placenames in Thrace proper, i.e. south of the Balkan mountains commonly end in -para or -pera, meaning "village" or "settlement" (cf Sanskrit pura = "town", from which derives Hindi town-suffix -pur, e.g., Udaipur = "city of Udai"). Map showing -dava/-para divide Georgiev argues that such toponymic divergence renders the notion that Thracian and Dacian were the same language implausible. However, this thesis has been challenged on a number of grounds:

1. Papazoglu (1978) and Tacheva (1997) reject the argument that such different placename-suffixes imply different languages (although, in general historical linguistics, changes in placename-suffixes are regarded as potentially strong evidence of changes in prevalent language). A possible objection is that, in 2 regions of Thrace, -para is not the standard suffix: in NE Thrace, placenames commonly end in -bria ("town"), while in SE Thrace, -diza/-dizos ("stronghold") is the most common ending. Following Georgiev's logic, this would indicate that these regions spoke a language different from Thracian. It is possible that this was the case: NE Thrace, for example, was a region of intensive Celtic settlement and may, therefore, have retained Celtic speech into Roman imperial times. If, on the other hand, the different endings were due simply to Thracian regional dialectal variations, the same could be true of the dava/para divide.
2. Papazoglu (1978) and Fisher (2003) point out that two -dava placenames are found in Thrace proper, in contravention of Georgiev's placename divide: Pulpudeva and Desudaba. (Note: Papazoglu 1978, p. 79: "... To explain the appearance of Desudaba and Pulpudeva on Thracian territory we must suppose that word dava was understandable to the Thracians although they used it infrequently. It is quite common thing in the same linguistic area to find that one type of place-name appears more frequently, or even exclusively in one district, another in another...") However, according to Georgiev (1977), east of a line formed by the Nestos and Uskur rivers, the traditional western boundary of Thrace proper, Pulpudeva is the only known -dava-type placename, and Georgiev argues that it is not linguistically significant, as it was an extraneous and late foundation by the Macedonian king Philip II (Philippopolis) and its -dava name a "Daco-Moesian" import.
3. The dava/para divide appears to break down West of the Nestos-Uskur line, where -dava placenames, including Desudaba, are intermingled with -para names. However, this does not necessarily invalidate Georgiev's thesis, as this region was the border-zone between the Roman provinces of Moesia Superior and Thracia and the mixed placename suffixes may reflect a mixed Thracian/"Daco-Moesian" population.

Georgiev's thesis has by no means achieved general acceptance: the Thraco-Dacian theory retains substantial support among linguists. Crossland (1982) considers that the divergence of a presumed original Thraco-Dacian language into northern and southern groups of dialects is not so significant as to rank them as separate languages. According to Georg Solta (1982), there is no significant difference between Dacian and Thracian. (Note: Rosetti 1982, p. 5: "Solta montre qu'il n'y a pas de difference entre le thrace et le dace") Rădulescu (1984) accepts that Daco-Moesian possesses a certain degree of dialectal individuality, but argues that there is no fundamental separation between Daco-Moesian and Thracian. Renfrew (1990) argues that there is no doubt that Thracian is related to the Dacian which was spoken in modern-day Romania before that area was occupied by the Romans. However, all these assertions are largely speculative, due to the lack of evidence for both languages.

Polomé (1982) considers that the evidence presented by Georgiev and Duridanov, although substantial, is not sufficient to determine whether Daco-Moesian and Thracian were two dialects of the same language or two distinct languages.

==== Illyrian ====
Dacian belonged to the Paleo-Balkan group, which also included Illyrian, but whether they had a genetic relationship is uncertain due to the scantly documented material. Some scholars have proposed a Thraco-Illyrian branch, and some even suggest that Illyrian, Dacian and Thracian were three dialects of the same language.

==== Gothic ====
There was a well-established tradition in the 4th century that the Getae, believed to be Dacians by mainstream scholarship, and the Gothi were the same people, e.g., Orosius: Getae illi qui et nunc Gothi. This identification, now discredited, was supported by Jacob Grimm. In pursuit of his hypothesis, Grimm proposed many kindred features between the Getae and Germanic tribes.

=== Relationship with modern languages ===
==== Romanian ====
According to some scholars Dacian constitutes the main source of pre-Romance features in modern Romanian, a neo-Latin (Romance) language, which evolved from eastern Eastern Romance in the period AD 300–600, according to Georgiev. The possible residual influence of Daco-Moesian on modern Romanian is limited to a modest number of words and a few grammatical peculiarities.

As in the case of any Romance language, it is argued that Romanian language derived from Vulgar Latin through a series of internal linguistic changes and because of Dacian or northern Thracian influences on Vulgar Latin in the late Roman era. This influence explains a number of differences between the Romanian-Thracian substrate and the French-Celtic, Spanish-Basque, and Portuguese-Celtic substrates. Romanian has no major dialects, perhaps a reflection of its origin in a small mountain region, which was inaccessible but permitted easy internal communication. The history of Romanian is based on speculation because there are virtually no written records of the area from the time of the withdrawal of the Romans around 300 AD until the end of the barbarian invasions around 1300 AD.

Many scholars, mostly Romanian, have conducted research into a Dacian linguistic substratum for the modern Romanian language. There is still not enough evidence for this. None of the few Dacian words known (mainly plant-names) and none of the Dacian words reconstructed from placenames have specific correspondent words in Romanian (as opposed to general correspondents in several IE languages). DEX doesn't mention any Dacian etymology, just a number of terms of unknown origin. Most of these are assumed by several scholars to be of Dacian origin, but there is no proof that they are. It seems plausible that a few Dacian words may have survived in the speech of the Carpathian inhabitants through successive changes in the region's predominant languages: Dacian/Celtic (to AD 100), Latin/Sarmatian (c. 100–300), Germanic (c. 300–500), Slavic/Turkic (c. 500–1300), up to the Romanian language when the latter became the predominant language in the region.

===== Substratum of Common Romanian =====
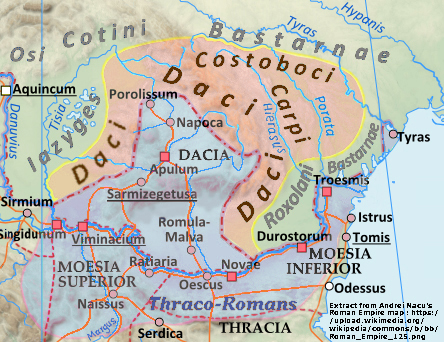
Blue = lands conquered by the Roman Empire. Red = area populated by Free Dacians. Language map based on the range of Dacian toponyms.

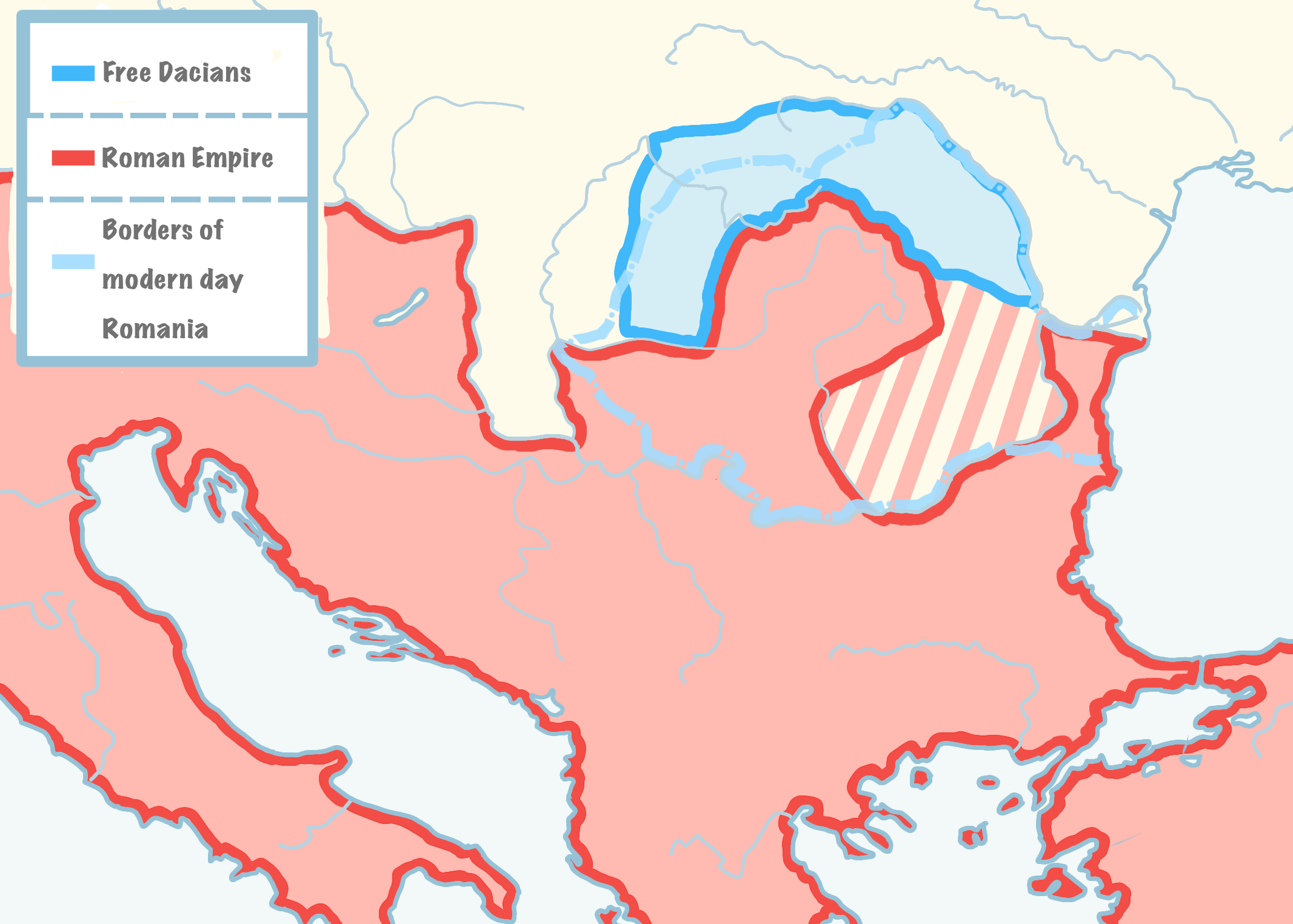
Map depicting the territories of the Dacians and the borders of the Roman Empire within present-day Romania.

The Romanian language has been denoted "Daco-Romanian" by some scholars because according to them it derives from late Latin superimposed on a Dacian substratum, and evolved in the Roman colony of Dacia between AD 106 and 275. According to this point of view, Modern Romanian may contain 160–170 words of Dacian origin. By comparison, modern French, according to Bulei, has approximately 180 words of Celtic origin. The Celtic origin of the French substratum is certain, as the Celtic languages are abundantly documented, whereas the Dacian origin of Romanian words is in most cases speculative.

It is also argued that the Dacian language may form the substratum of Common Romanian, which developed from the Vulgar Latin spoken in the Balkans north of the Jirecek line, which roughly divides Latin influence from Greek influence. About 300 words in Eastern Romance languages, Daco-Romanian, Aromanian, Megleno-Romanian, Istro-Romanian, may derive from Dacian, and many of these show a satem-reflex. Whether Dacian forms the substratum of Common Romanian is disputed, yet this theory does not rely only on the Romanisation having occurred in Roman Dacia, as Dacian was also spoken in the Roman province of Moesia and northern Dardania. The territory that later became Moesia was conquered by the Romans more than a century before Dacia, and its Latinity is confirmed by Christian sources.

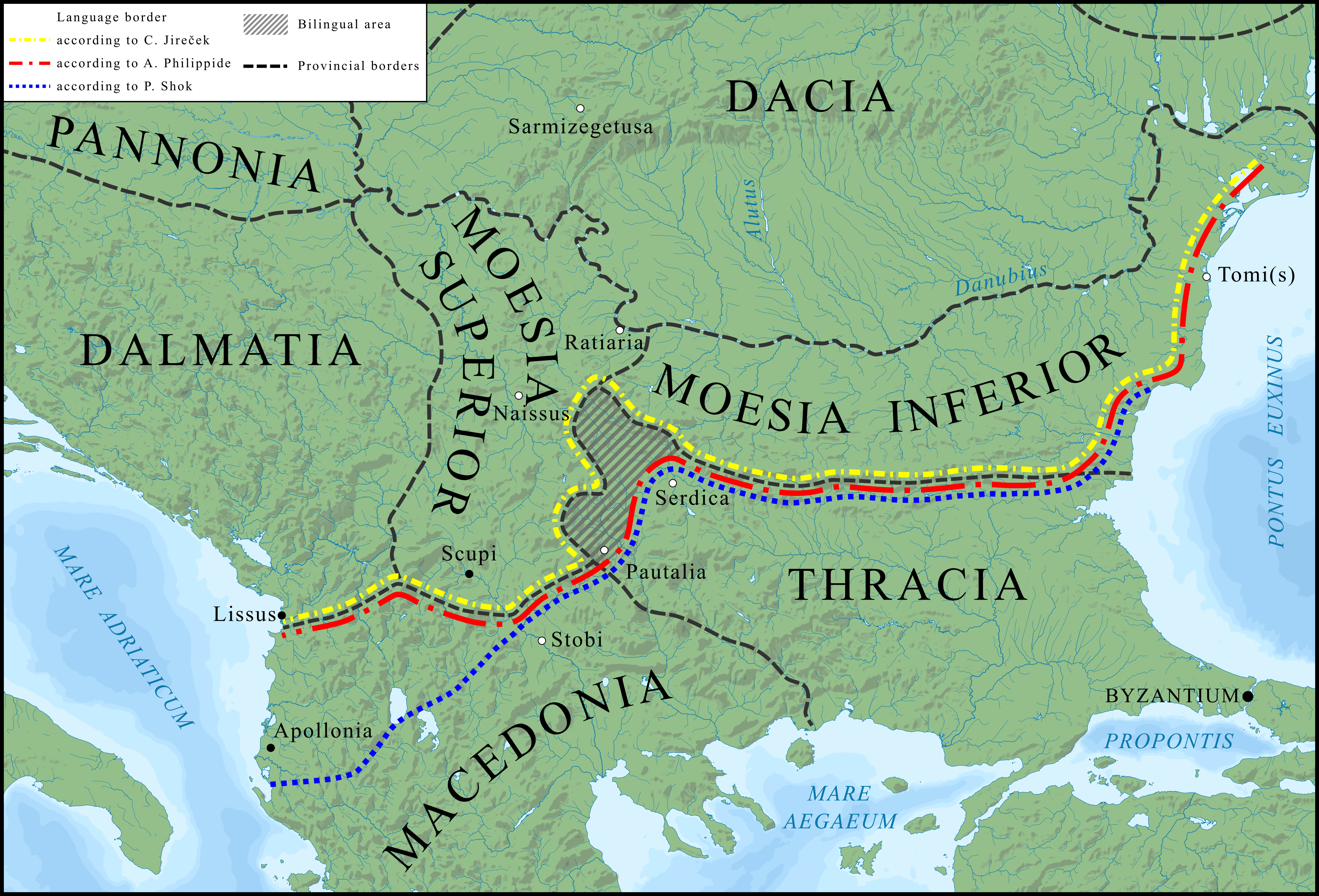
The Jireček Line, an imaginary line through the ancient Balkans that divided the influences of the Latin (in the north) and Greek (in the south) languages until the 4th century. This line is important in establishing the Romanization area in Balkans

Many of the pre-Roman lexical items of Romanian have Albanian parallels, a number of which are however loanwords from Albanian. The words that may be cognates with the Albanian ones, and not loanwords from Albanian, indicate that the substrate language of Romanian may have been on the same IE branch of Albanian. Some scholars speculate they may have been Dacian, but there is no way to prove it.

==== Albanian ====
Vladimir I. Georgiev, although accepting an Illyrian component in Albanian, and even not excluding an Illyrian origin of Albanian, proposed as the ancestor of Albanian a language called "Daco-Mysian" by him, considering it a separate language from Thracian. Georgiev maintained that "Daco-Mysian tribes gradually migrated to the northern-central part of the Balkan Peninsula, approximately to Dardania, probably in the second millennium B.C. (or not later than the first half of the first millennium B.C.), and thence they migrated to the areas of present Albania". However, this theory is rejected by most linguists, who consider Albanian a direct descendant of ancient Illyrian. Based on shared innovations between Albanian and Messapic, Eric P. Hamp has argued that Albanian is closely related to Illyrian and not to Thracian or Daco-Moesian, maintaining that it descended from a language that was sibling of Illyrian and that was once closer to the Danube and in contact with Daco-Moesian. Due to the paucity of written evidence, what can be said with certainty in current research is that on the one hand a significant group of shared Indo-European non-Romance cognates between Albanian and Romanian indicates at least contact with the 'Daco-Thraco-Moesian complex', and that on the other hand there is some evidence to argue that Albanian is descended from the 'Illyrian complex'. From a "genealogical standpoint", Messapic is the closest at least partially attested language to Albanian. Hyllested & Joseph (2022) label this Albanian-Messapic branch as Illyric and in agreement with recent bibliography identify Greco-Phrygian as the IE branch closest to the Albanian-Messapic one. These two branches form an areal grouping - which is often called "Balkan IE" - with Armenian.

==== Baltic languages ====
There is significant evidence of at least a long-term proximity link, and possibly a genetic link, between Dacian and the modern Baltic languages. The Bulgarian linguist Ivan Duridanov, in his first publication claimed that Thracian and Dacian are genetically linked to the Baltic languages and in the next one he made the following classification:

"The Thracian language formed a close group with the Baltic (resp. Balto-Slavic), the Dacian and the "Pelasgian" languages. More distant were its relations with the other Indo-European languages, and especially with Greek, the Italic and Celtic languages, which exhibit only isolated phonetic similarities with Thracian; the Tokharian and the Hittite were also distant."

Duridanov's cognates of the reconstructed Dacian words are found mostly in the Baltic languages, followed by Albanian without considering Thracian. Parallels have enabled linguists, using the techniques of comparative linguistics, to decipher the meanings of several Dacian and Thracian placenames with, they claim, a high degree of probability. Of 74 Dacian placenames attested in primary sources and considered by Duridanov, a total of 62 have Baltic cognates, most of which were rated "certain" by Duridanov. Polomé considers that these parallels are unlikely to be coincidence. Duridanov's explanation is that proto-Dacian and proto-Thracian speakers were in close geographical proximity with proto-Baltic speakers for a prolonged period, perhaps during the period 3000–2000 BC. A number of scholars such as the Russian Topоrov have pointed to the many close parallels between Dacian and Thracian placenames and those of the Baltic language-zone – Lithuania, Latvia and in East Prussia (where an extinct but well-documented Baltic language, Old Prussian, was spoken until it was displaced by German during the Middle Ages).

After creating a list of names of rivers and personal names with a high number of parallels, the Romanian linguist Mircea M. Radulescu classified the Daco-Moesian and Thracian as Baltic languages of the south and also proposed such classification for Illyrian. The German linguist Schall also attributed a southern Baltic classification to Dacian. The American linguist Harvey Mayer refers to both Dacian and Thracian as Baltic languages. He claims to have sufficient evidence for classifying them as Baltoidic or at least "Baltic-like," if not exactly, Baltic dialects or languages and classifies Dacians and Thracians as "Balts by extension". According to him, Albanian, the descendant of Illyrian, escaped any heavy Baltic influence of Daco-Thracian. Mayer claims that he extracted an unambiguous evidence for regarding Dacian and Thracian as more tied to Lithuanian than to Latvian. The Czech archaeologist Kristian Turnvvald classified Dacian as Danubian Baltic. The Venezuelan-Lithuanian historian Jurate de Rosales classifies Dacian and Thracian as Baltic languages.

It appears from the study of hydronyms (river and lake names) that Baltic languages once predominated much farther eastwards and southwards than their modern confinement to the southeastern shores of the Baltic sea, and included regions that later became predominantly Slavic-speaking. The zone of Baltic hydronyms extends along the Baltic coast from the mouth of the Oder as far as Riga, eastwards as far as the line Yaroslavl–Moscow–Kursk and southwards as far as the line Oder mouth–Warsaw–Kyiv–Kursk: it thus includes much of northern and eastern Poland, Belarus and central European Russia.

=== Dacian as an Italic language ===
Another theory maintains that the Dacians spoke a language akin to Latin and that the people who settled in the Italian Peninsula shared the same ancestors.

The Romanian philologist Nicolae Densușianu argued in his book Dacia Preistorică (Prehistoric Dacia), published in 1913, that Latin and Dacian were the same language or were mutually intelligible. His work was considered by mainstream linguists to be pseudoscience. It was reprinted under the regime of Nicolae Ceaușescu. The first article to revive Densușianu's theory was an unsigned paper, "The Beginnings of the History of the Romanian People", included in Anale de istorie, a journal published by the Romanian Communist Party's Institute of Historical and Social-Political Studies. The article claimed that the Thracian language was a pre-Romance or Latin language. Arguments used in the article include for instance the absence of interpreters between the Dacians and the Romans, as depicted on the bas-reliefs of Trajan's column. The bibliography mentions, apart from Densușianu, the work of French academician Louis Armand, an engineer who allegedly showed that "the Thraco-Dacians spoke a pre-Romance language". Similar arguments are found in Iosif Constantin Drăgan's We, the Thracians (1976). About the same time Ion Horațiu Crișan wrote "Burebista and His Age" (1975). Nevertheless, the theory didn't rise to official status under Ceaușescu's rule.

Opinions about a hypothetical latinity of Dacian can be found in earlier authors: Sextus Rufus (Breviarum C.VIII, cf. Bocking Not, Dign. II, 6), Ovid (Trist. II, 188–189) and Horace (Odes, I, 20).

Iosif Constantin Drăgan and the New York City-based physician Napoleon Săvescu continued to support this theory and published a book entitled We Are Not Rome's Descendants. They also published a magazine called Noi, Dacii ("Us Dacians") and organised a yearly "International Congress of Dacology".

Less radical theories have suggested that Dacian was either Italic or Celtic, like the speakers of those Indo-European languages in Western Europe who became Latinized and now speak Romance languages.

== Geographical extent ==
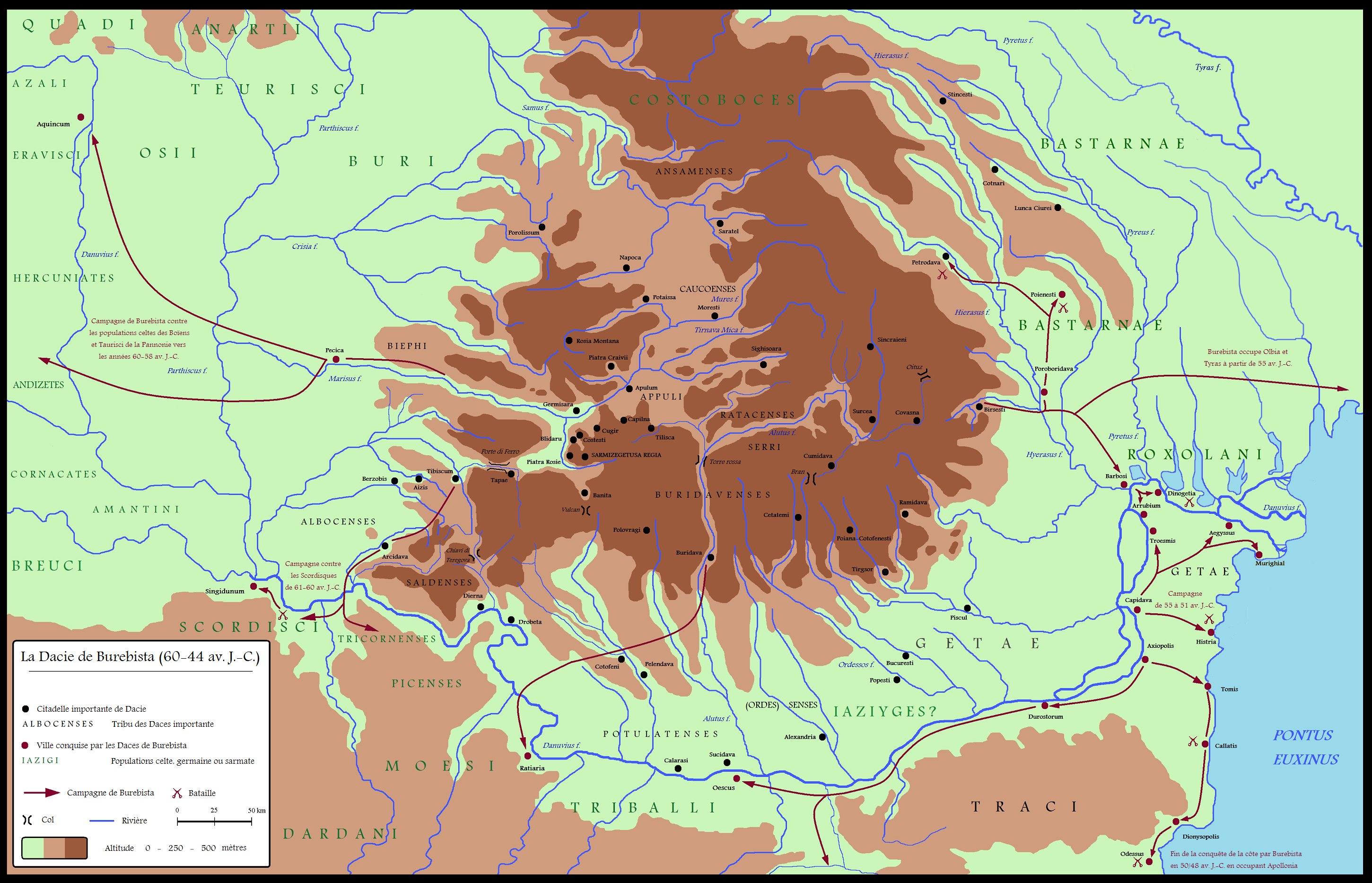
Map of Dacia 1st century BC

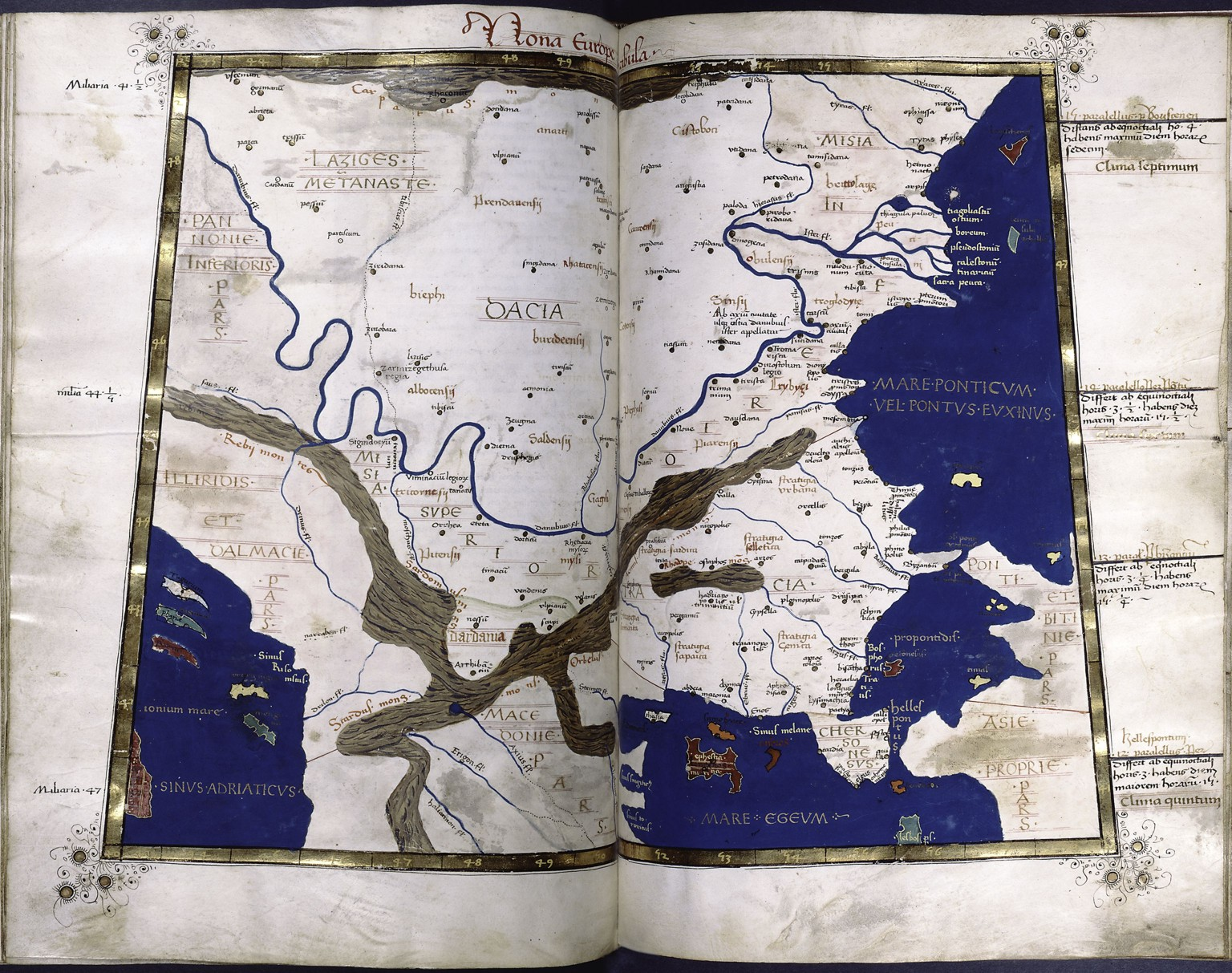
Dacia's map from a medieval book made after Ptolemy's Geographia (c. 140 AD)

=== Linguistic area ===
Dacian was probably one of the major languages of south-eastern Europe, spoken in the area between the Danube, Northern Carpathians, the Dnister River and the Balkans, and the Black Sea shore. According to historians, due to the linguistic unity of the Getae and Dacians that are found in the records of ancient writers Strabo, Cassius Dio, Trogus Pompeius, Appian, and Pliny the Elder, contemporary historiography often uses the term Geto-Dacians to refer to the people living in the area between the Carpathians, the Haemus (Balkan) Mountains, the Black Sea, Dnister River, Northern Carpathians, and middle Danube. Strabo provided more specific information, noting that "the Dacians speak the same language as the Getae," a dialect of the Thracian language. The information provided by the Greek geographer is complemented by other literary, linguistic, and archaeological evidence. Accordingly, the Geto-Dacians may have occupied territory in the west and north-west, as far as Moravia and the middle Danube, to the area of present-day Serbia in the south-west, and as far as the Haemus Mountains (Balkans) in the south. The eastern limit of the territory inhabited by the Geto-Dacians may have been the shore of the Black Sea and the Tyras River (Dnister), possibly at times reaching as far as the Bug River, the northern limit including the Trans-Carpathian westernmost Ukraine and southern Poland.

Over time, some peripheral areas of the Geto-Dacians' territories were affected by the presence of other people, such as the Celts in the west, the Illyrians in the south-west, the Greeks and Scythians in the east and the Bastarnae in the north-east. Nevertheless, between the Danube River (West), the Haemus Mountains (S), the Black Sea (E), the Dniester River (NE) and the northern Carpathians, a continuous Geto-Dacian presence as majority was permanently maintained, according to some scholars. According to the Bulgarian linguist Georgiev, the Daco-Mysian region included Dacia (approximately contemporary Romania and Hungary east of the Tisza River, Mysia (Moesia) and Scythia Minor (contemporary Dobrogea).

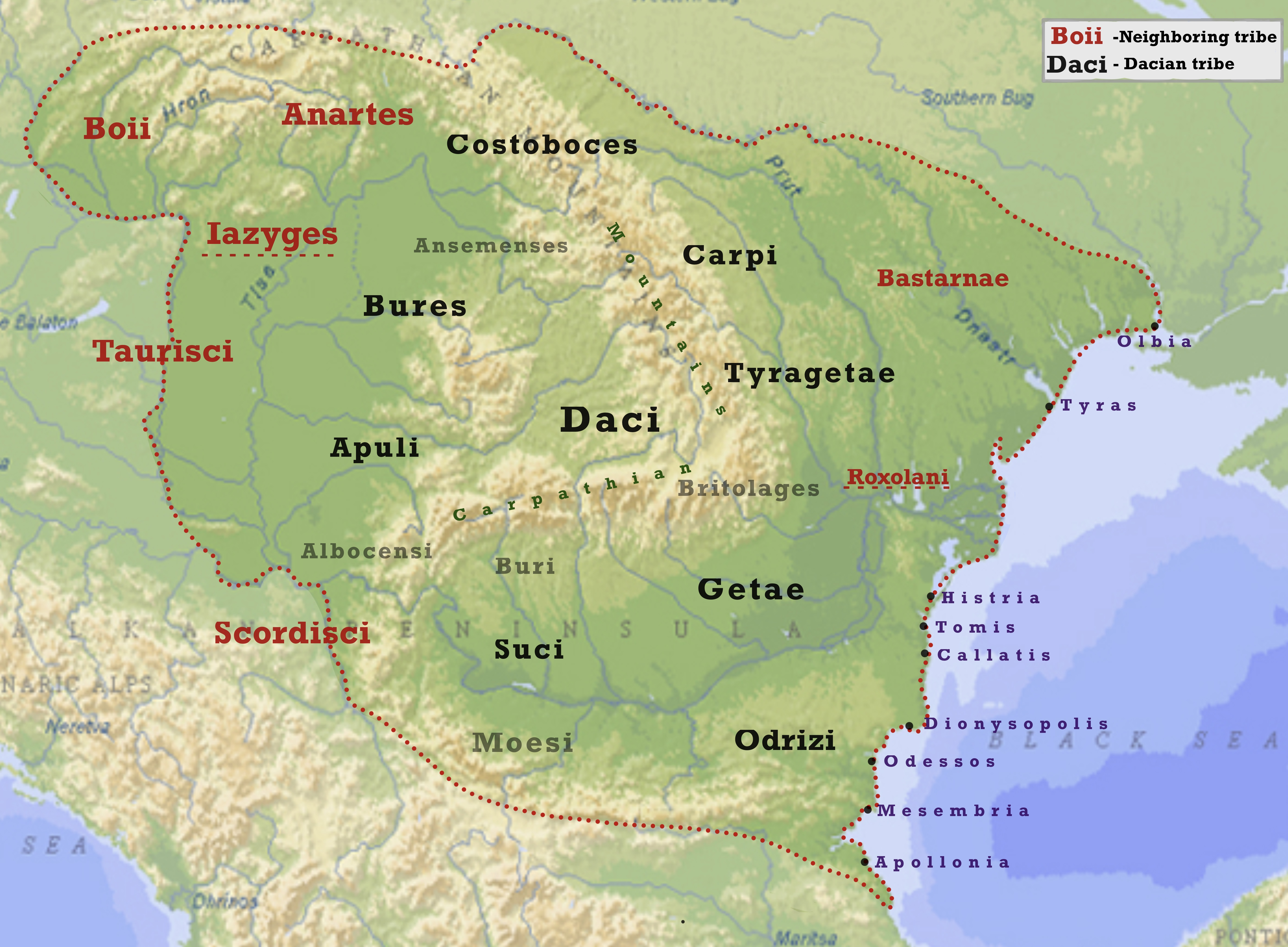
Dacian kingdom at its territorial peak during Burebista reign.

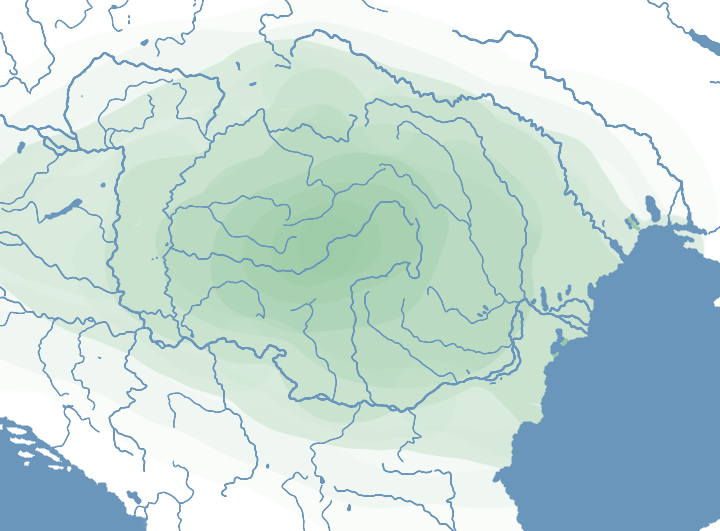
The approximate map showing where the Dacian language was spoken

=== Chronology ===
==== 1st century BC ====
In 53 BC, Julius Caesar stated that the lands of the Dacians started on the eastern edge of the Hercynian Forest. This corresponds to the period between 82 and 44 BC, when the Dacian state reached its widest extent during the reign of King Burebista: in the west it may have extended as far as the middle Danube River valley in present-day Hungary, in the east and north to the Carpathians in present-day Slovakia and in the south to the lower Dniester valley in present-day south-western Ukraine and the western coast of the Black Sea as far as Appollonia. At that time, some scholars believe, the Dacians built a series of hill-forts at Zemplin (Slovakia), Mala Kopania (Ukraine), Oncești, Maramureș (Romania) and Solotvyno (Ukraine). The Zemplin settlement appears to belong to a Celto-Dacian horizon, as well as the river Patissus (Tisa)'s region, including its upper stretch, according to Shchukin (1989). According to Parducz (1956) Foltiny (1966), Dacian archaeological finds extend to the west of Dacia, and occur along both banks of the Tisza. Besides the possible incorporation of a part of Slovakia into the Dacian state of Burebista, there was also Geto-Dacian penetration of south-eastern Poland, according to Mielczarek (1989). The Polish linguist Milewski Tadeusz (1966 and 1969) suggests that in the southern regions of Poland appear names that are unusual in northern Poland, possibly related to Dacian or Illyrian names. On the grounds of these names, it has been argued that the region of the Carpathian and Tatra Mountains was inhabited by Dacian tribes linguistically related to the ancestors of modern Albanians.

Also, a formal statement by Pliny indicated the river Vistula as the western boundary of Dacia, according to Nicolet (1991). Between the Prut and the Dniester, the northern extent of the appearance of Geto-Dacian elements in the 4th century BC coincides roughly with the extent of the present-day Republic of Moldova, according to Mielczarek.

According to Müllenhoff (1856), Schütte (1917), Urbańczyk (2001) and Matei-Popescu (2007), Agrippa's commentaries mention the river Vistula as the western boundary of Dacia. (Note: Schütte 1917, p. 87: "The Romans knew the dimensions of Dacia, as it is stated by Agrippa (c. 63 BC – 12 BC) in his Commentaries: 'Dacia, Getica finiuntur ab oriente desertis Sarmatiae, ab occidente flumine Vistula, a septentrione Oceano, a meridie flumine Histro. quae patent in longitudine milia passuum CCLXXX, in latitudine qua cognitum est milia passuura CCCLXXXVI'") Urbańczyk (1997) speculates that according to Agrippa's commentaries, and the map of Agrippa (before 12 BC), the Vistula river separated Germania and Dacia. This map is lost and its contents are unknown (Note: See one possible reconstruction: (livius: Image)) However, later Roman geographers, including Ptolemy (AD 90 – c. AD 168) (II.10, III.7) and Tacitus (AD 56 – AD 117) considered the Vistula as the boundary between Germania and Sarmatia Europaea, or Germania and Scythia.

==== 1st century AD ====
Around 20 AD, Strabo wrote the Geographica that provides information regarding the extent of regions inhabited by the Dacians. On its basis, Lengyel and Radan (1980), Hoddinott (1981) and Mountain (1998) consider that the Geto-Dacians inhabited both sides of the Tisza river before the rise of the Celtic Boii and again after the latter were defeated by the Dacians. (Note: Strabo, VII.3.1: "As for the southern part of Germany beyond the Albis, the portion which is just contiguous to that river is occupied by the Suevi; then immediately adjoining this is the land of the Getae, which, though narrow at first, stretching as it does along the Ister on its southern side and on the opposite side along the mountain-side of the Hercynian Forest (for the land of the Getae also embraces a part of the mountains), afterwards broadens out towards the north as far as the Tyregetae; but I cannot tell the precise boundaries.") (Note: Lengyel et al. 1980, p. 87 "No matter where the Boii first settled after they left Italia, however, when they arrived at the Danube they had to fight the Dacians who held the entire territory — or at least part of it. Strabo tells us that later animosity between the Dacians and the Boii stemmed from the fact that the Dacians demanded the land from the latter which the Dacians pretended to have possessed earlier.") The hold of the Dacians between the Danube and the Tisza appears to have been tenuous. However, the Hungarian archaeologist Parducz (1856) argued for a Dacian presence west of the Tisza dating from the time of Burebista. According to Tacitus (AD 56 – AD 117) Dacians were bordering Germany in the south-east while Sarmatians bordered it in the east. (Note: Gruen 2011, p. 204 Germany as a whole is separated from the Gauls and from the Raetians and Pannonians by the rivers Rhine and Danube, from the Sarmatians and Dacians by mutual fear or mountains; the ocean surrounds the rest of it.)

In the 1st century AD, the Iazyges settled in the west of Dacia, on the plain between the Danube and the Tisza rivers, according to some scholars' interpretation of Pliny's text: "The higher parts between the Danube and the Hercynian Forest (Black Forest) as far as the winter quarters of Pannonia at Carnuntum and the plains and level country of the German frontiers there are occupied by the Sarmatian Iazyges, while the Dacians whom they have driven out hold the mountains and forests as far as the river Theiss".

Archaeological sources indicate that the local Celto-Dacian population retained its specificity as late as the 3rd century AD. Archaeological finds dated to the 2nd century AD, after the Roman conquest, indicate that during that period, vessels found in some of the Iazygian cemeteries reveal fairly strong Dacian influence, according to Mocsy. M. Párducz (1956) and Z. Visy (1971) reported a concentration of Dacian-style finds in the Cris-Mures-Tisza region and in the Danube bend area near Budapest. These maps of finds remain valid today, but they have been complemented with additional finds that cover a wider area, particularly the interfluvial region between the Danube and Tisza. However, this interpretation has been invalidated by late 20th-century archaeology, which has discovered Sarmatian settlements and burial sites all over the Hungarian Plain on both sides of the Tisza, e.g., Gyoma in south-eastern Hungary and Nyiregyhaza in north-eastern Hungary. The Barrington Atlas shows the Iazyges occupying both sides of Tisza (map 20).

==== 2nd century AD ====
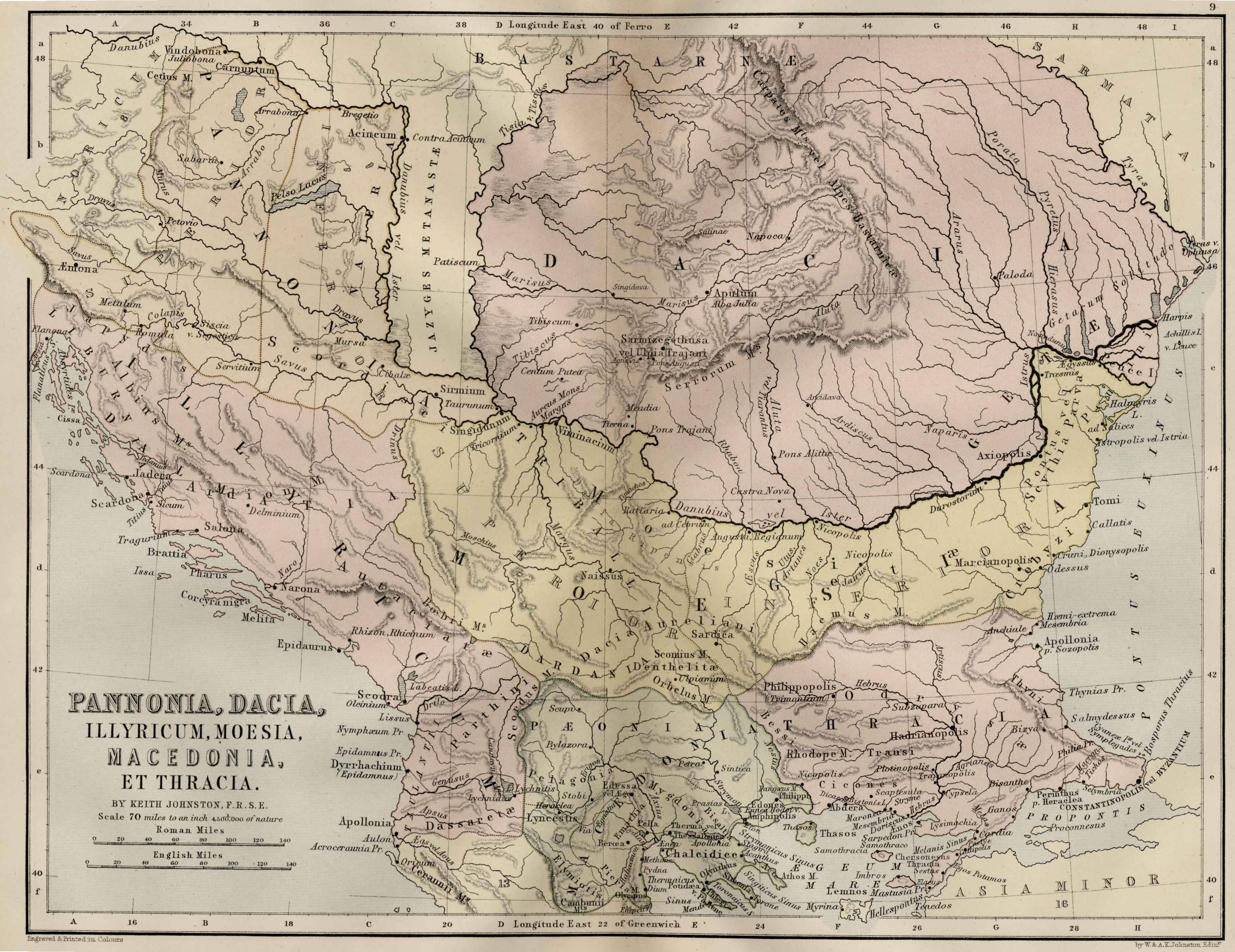
Map of South-eastern Europe including Dacia

Written a few decades after the Roman conquest of Dacia 105–106 AD, Ptolemy's Geographia defined the boundaries of Dacia. There is a consensus among scholars that Ptolemy's Dacia was the region between the rivers Tisza, Danube, upper Dniester, and Siret. (Note: Hrushevskyi 1997, p. 97: Dacia, as described by Ptolemy, occupied the region between the Tisza, Danube, upper Dnister, and Seret, while the Black Sea coast—namely, the Greek colonies of Tyras, Olbia, and others—were included in Lower Moesia.) The mainstream of historians accepted this interpretation: Avery (1972) Berenger (1994) Fol (1996) Mountain (1998), Waldman Mason (2006). Ptolemy also provided Dacian toponyms in the Upper Vistula (Polish: Wisła) river basin in Poland: Susudava and Setidava (with a manuscript variant Getidava. This may be an echo of Burebista's expansion. It appears that this northern expansion of the Dacian language as far as the Vistula river lasted until 170–180 AD when the Hasdings, a Germanic tribe, expelled a Dacian group from this region, according to Schütte (1917) and Childe (1930). This Dacian group is associated by Schütte (1952) with towns having the specific Dacian language ending 'dava' i.e. Setidava. A previous Dacian presence that ended with the Hasdings' arrival is considered also by Heather (2010) who says that the Hasdings Vandals "attempted to take control of lands which had previously belonged to a free Dacian group called the Costoboci" Several tribes on the northern slopes of the Carpathians were mentioned that are generally considered Thraco-Dacian, i.e. Arsietae (Upper Vistula), Biessi / Biessoi and Piengitai. Schütte (1952) associated the Dacian tribe of Arsietae with the Arsonion town. The ancient documents attest names with the Dacian name ending -dava 'town' in the Balto-Slavic territory, in the country of Arsietae tribe, at the sources of the Vistula river. The Biessi inhabited the foothills of the Carpathian Mountains, which on Ptolemy's map are located on the headwaters of the Dnister and Sian Rivers, the right-bank Carpathian tributary of the Vistula river. The Biessi (Biessoi) probably left their name to the mountain chain of Bieskides that continues the Carpathian Mountains towards the north (Schütte 1952). Ptolemy (140 AD) lists only Germanic or Balto-Slavic tribes, and no Dacians,on both sides of the Vistula (ref: II.10; III.7), as does the Barrington Atlas (map 19).

After the Marcomannic Wars (166–180 AD), Dacian groups from outside Roman Dacia had been set in motion, and thus were the 12,000 Dacians "from the neighbourhood of Roman Dacia sent away from their own country". Their native country could have been the Upper Tisza region but other places cannot be excluded.

=== Dacian linguistic zone in the early Roman imperial era (30 BC – AD 100) ===
==== Historical linguistic overview ====
Starting around 400 BC, Celtic groups, moving out of their La Tène cultural heartland in southern Germany/eastern Gaul, penetrated and settled south-eastern Europe as far as the Black Sea and into Anatolia. By c. 250 BC, much of the modern states of Austria, Slovakia, Hungary and Romania, and Bessarabia and Moesia, were under Celtic cultural influence and probably political domination in many regions. This migratory process brought Celtic material culture, especially advanced in metallurgy, to the Illyrian and Dacian tribes. Especially intensive Celtic settlement, as evidenced by concentrations of La Tène-type cemeteries, took place in Austria, Slovakia, the Hungarian Plain, Transylvania, Bessarabia and eastern Thrace. Central Transylvania appears to have become a Celtic enclave or unitary kingdom, according to Batty. It is likely that during the period of Celtic pre-eminence, the Dacian language was eclipsed by Celtic dialects in Transylvania. In the territory that in Roman times became Moesia, South of the Danube, there was also extensive Celticisation. An example is the Scordisci tribe of Moesia Superior, reported by the ancient historian Livy to be Celtic-speaking and whose culture displays Celtic features.

By 60 BC, Celtic political hegemony in the region appears to have collapsed, and the indigenous Dacian tribes throughout the region appear to have reasserted their identity and political independence. This process may have been partly due to the career of the Getan king Burebista (ruled ca 80 – 44 BC), who appears to have coalesced several Getic and Dacian tribes under his leadership. It is likely that in this period, the Dacian language regained its former predominance in Transylvania.

In 29–26 BC, the southern Danubian area that later became known as Moesia was conquered and annexed by the Romans. There followed an intensive process of Romanisation. The Danube, as the new frontier of the empire and main fluvial supply route for the Roman military, was soon dotted with forts and supply depots, which were garrisoned by several legions and many auxiliary units. Numerous colonies of Roman army veterans were established. The presence of the Roman military resulted in a huge influx of non-Dacian immigrants, such as soldiers, their dependents, ancillary workers and merchants, from every part of the Roman Empire, especially from the rest of the Balkans, into Moesia. It is likely that by the time the emperor Trajan invaded Dacia (101–6), the Dacian language had been largely replaced by Latin in Moesia.

The conquest of Dacia saw a similar process of Romanisation north of the Danube, so that by 200 AD, Latin was probably predominant in the zone permanently occupied by the Romans. In addition, it appears that some unoccupied parts of the dava zone were overrun, either before or during the Dacian Wars, by Sarmatian tribes; for example, eastern Wallachia, which had fallen under the Roxolani by 68 AD. By around 200 AD, it is likely that the Dacian language was confined to those parts of the dava zone occupied by the Free Dacian groups, which may have amounted to little more than the eastern Carpathians.

Under the emperor Aurelian (r. 270–275), the Romans withdrew their administration and armed forces, and possibly a significant proportion of the provincial population, from the part of Dacia they ruled. The subsequent linguistic status of this region is disputed. Traditional Romanian historiography maintains that a Latin-speaking population persisted into medieval times, to form the basis of today's Romanian-speaking inhabitants. But this hypothesis lacks evidential basis (e.g., the absence of any post-275 Latin inscriptions in the region, other than on imported Roman coins/artefacts). What is certain is that by AD 300, the entire North Danubian region had fallen under the political domination of Germanic-speaking groups, a hegemony that continued until c. AD 500: the Goths held overall hegemony, and under them, lesser Germanic tribes such as the Taifali and Gepids. Some historians consider that the region became Germanic-speaking during this period. At least one part, Wallachia, may have become Slavic-speaking by AD 600, as it is routinely referred to Sklavinía (Greek for "Land of the Slavs") by contemporary Byzantine chroniclers. The survival of the Dacian language in this period is impossible to determine, due to a complete lack of documentation. However, it is generally believed that the language was extinct by AD 600.

==== Dacia and Moesia: zone of toponyms ending in -dava ====
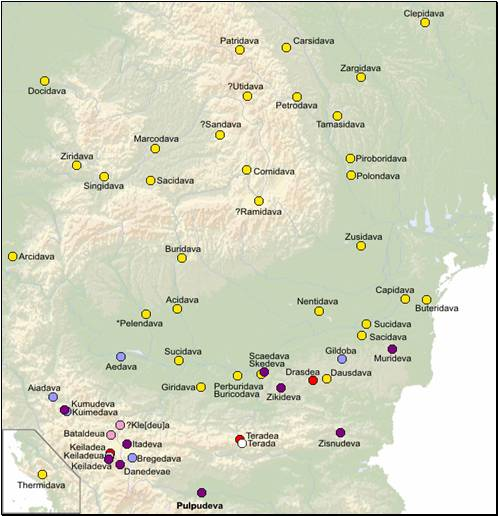
Onomastic range of towns with the dava or deva ending considered to be characteristic of the Dacian language. They are mostly found throughout Dacia and northern Thrace, some also in eastern Illyria.

At the start of the Roman imperial era (30 BC), the Dacian language was probably predominant to the north of the Danube in Dacia, and also spoken south of the Danube in parts of the region that became known as Moesia in Roman times.

North of the Danube, the dava-zone is largely consistent with Ptolemy's definition of Dacia's borders (III.8.1–3) i.e. the area contained by the river Ister (Danube) to the south, the river Thibiscum (Timiș) to the west, the upper river Tyras (Dniester) to the north and the river Hierasus (Siret) to the east. To the west, it appears that the -dava placenames in Olteanu's map lie within the line of the Timiş, extended northwards. However, four davas are located beyond the Siret, Ptolemy's eastern border. But three of these, Piroboridava, Tamasidava and Zargidava, are described by Ptolemy as pará (Gr."very close") to the Siret: Piroboridava, the only one securely located, was 3 km from the Siret. The location of Clepidava is uncertain: Olteanu locates it in north-east Bessarabia, but Georgiev places it further west, in south-west Ukraine, between the upper reaches of the Siret and Dniester rivers.

South of the Danube in the Roman era, a dialect of Dacian, referred to as "Daco-Moesian" by some modern scholars, was also spoken in the region called Moesia by the Romans, which was divided by them into the Roman provinces of Moesia Superior (roughly modern Serbia) and Moesia Inferior (modern northern Bulgaria as far as the Balkan range plus Roman Dobruja region). This is evidenced by the distribution of -dava placenames, which occur in the eastern half of Moesia Superior and all over Inferior.

However, the dava-zone was not exclusively or uniformly Dacian-speaking during historical times. Significant Celtic elements survived there into the 2nd century AD: Ptolemy (III.8.3) lists two Celtic peoples, the Taurisci and Anartes, as resident in the northernmost part of Dacia, in the northern Carpathians. The partly Celtic Bastarnae are also attested in this region in literature and the archaeological record during the 1st century BC; they probably remained in the 1st century AD, according to Batty.

===== Republic of Moldova =====
To the east, beyond the Siret River, it has been argued by numerous scholars that Dacian was also the main language of the modern regions of Moldavia and Bessarabia, at least as far east as the river Dniester. The main evidence used to support this hypothesis consists of three -dava placenames which Ptolemy located just east of the Siret; and the mainstream identification as ethnic-Dacian of two peoples resident in Moldavia: the Carpi and Costoboci. However, the Dacian ethnicity of the Carpi and Costoboci is disputed in academic circles, and they have also been variously identified as Sarmatian, Germanic, Celtic or proto-Slavic. Numerous non-Dacian peoples, both sedentary and nomadic, the Scytho-Sarmatian Roxolani and Agathyrsi, Germanic/Celtic Bastarnae and Celtic Anartes, are attested to in the ancient sources and in the archaeological record as inhabiting this region. The linguistic status of this region during the Roman era must therefore be considered uncertain. It is likely that a great variety of languages were spoken. If there was a lingua franca spoken by all inhabitants of the region, it was not necessarily Dacian: it could as likely have been Celtic or Germanic or Sarmatian.

===== Balkans =====
To the south, it has been argued that the ancient Thracian language was a dialect of Dacian, or vice versa, and that therefore the Dacian linguistic zone extended over the Roman province of Thracia, occupying modern-day Bulgaria south of the Balkan Mountains, northern Greece and European Turkey, as far as the Aegean Sea. But this theory, based on the testimony of the Augustan-era geographer Strabo's work Geographica VII.3.2 and 3.13, is disputed; opponents argue that Thracian was a distinct language from Dacian, either related or unrelated. (see Relationship with Thracian, below, for a detailed discussion of this issue).

===== Hungarian Plain =====
The hypothesis that Dacian was widely spoken to the north-west of Dacia is primarily based on the career of Dacian king Burebista, who ruled approximately between 80 and 44 BC. According to Strabo, Burebista coalesced the Geto-Dacian tribes under his leadership and conducted military operations as far as Pannonia and Thracia. Although Strabo appears to portray these campaigns as short-term raids for plunder and to punish his enemies, several Romanian scholars have argued, on the basis of controversial interpretation of archaeological data, that they resulted in longer-term Dacian occupation and settlement of large territories beyond the dava zone.

Some scholars have asserted that Dacian was the main language of the sedentary population of the Hungarian Plain, at least as far as the river Tisza, and possibly as far as the Danube. Statements by ancient authors such as Caesar, Strabo and Pliny the Elder have been controversially interpreted as supporting this view, but these are too vague or ambiguous to be of much geographical value. There is little hard evidence to support the thesis of a large ethnic-Dacian population on the Plain:

1. Toponyms: Ptolemy (III.7.1) provides 8 placenames for the territory of the Iazyges Metanastae (i.e. the Hungarian Plain). None of these carry the Dacian -dava suffix. At least three -Uscenum, Bormanum and the only one which can be located with confidence, Partiscum (Szeged, Hungary) – have been identified as Celtic placenames by scholars.
2. Archaeology: Concentrations of La Tène-type cemeteries suggest that the Hungarian Plain was the scene of heavy Celtic immigration and settlement in the period 400–260 BC (see above). During the period 100 BC – AD 100, the archaeology of the sedentary population of the Plain has been interpreted by some dated scholars as showing Dacian (Mocsy 1974) or Celto-Dacian (Parducz 1956) features. However, surveys of the results of excavations using modern scientific methods, e.g., Szabó (2005) and Almássy (2006), favour the view that the sedentary population of the Hungarian Plain in this period was predominantly Celtic and that any Dacian-style features were probably the results of trade. Of 94 contemporaneous sites excavated between 1986 and 2006, the vast majority have been identified as probably Celtic, while only two as possibly Dacian, according to Almássy, who personally excavated some of the sites. Almássy concludes: "In the Great Hungarian Plain, we have to count on a sporadic Celtic village network in which the Celtic inhabitants lived mixed with the people of the Scythian Age [referring to traces of an influx of Scythians during the 1st century BC], that could have continued into the Late Celtic Period without significant changes. This system consisted of small, farm-like settlements interspersed with a few relatively large villages... In the 1st century AD nothing refers to a significant immigration of Dacian people." Visy (1995) concurs that there is little archaeological evidence of a Dacian population on the Plain before its occupation by the Sarmatians in the late 1st century AD.
3. Epigraphy: Inscription AE (1905) 14 records a campaign on the Hungarian Plain by the Augustan-era general Marcus Vinucius, dated to 10 BC or 8 BC i.e. during or just after the Roman conquest of Pannonia (bellum Pannonicum 14–9 BC), in which Vinucius played a leading role as governor of the neighbouring Roman province of Illyricum. The inscription states: "Marcus Vinucius...[patronymic], Consul [in 19 BC] ...[various official titles], governor of Illyricum, the first [Roman general] to advance across the river Danube, defeated in battle and routed an army of Dacians and Basternae, and subjugated the Cotini, Osi,...[missing tribal name] and Anartii to the power of the emperor Augustus and of the people of Rome." The inscription suggests that the population of the Hungarian Plain retained their Celtic character in the time of Augustus: the scholarly consensus is that the Cotini and Anartes were Celtic tribes and the Osi either Celts or Celticised Illyrians.

===== Slovakia =====
To the north-west, the argument has been advanced that Dacian was also prevalent in modern-day Slovakia and parts of Poland. The basis for this is the presumed Dacian occupation of the fortress of Zemplin in Slovakia in the era of Dacian king Burebista – whose campaigns outside Dacia have been dated c. 60 – 44 BC – and Ptolemy's location of two -dava placenames on the lower Vistula River in Poland.

The hypothesis of a Dacian occupation of Slovakia during the 1st century BC is contradicted by the archaeological evidence that this region featured a predominantly Celtic culture from c. 400 BC; and a sophisticated kingdom of the Boii Celtic tribe. Based in modern-day Bratislava during the 1st century BC, this polity issued its own gold and silver coinage (the so-called "Biatec-type" coins), which bear the names of several kings with recognised Celtic names. This kingdom is also evidenced by numerous Celtic-type fortified hill-top settlements (oppida), of which Zemplin is the foremost example in south-east Slovakia. Furthermore, the archaeological Puchov culture, present in Slovakia in this period, is considered Celtic by mainstream scholars. Some scholars argue that Zemplin was occupied by Burebista's warriors from about 60 BC onwards, but this is based on the presence of Dacian-style artefacts alongside the Celtic ones, which may simply have been cultural imports. But even if occupation by Dacian troops under Burebista actually occurred, it would probably have been brief, as in 44 BC Burebista died and his kingdom collapsed and split into 4 fragments. In any case, it does not follow that the indigenous population became Dacian-speakers during the period of Dacian control. Karol Pieta's discussion of the ethnicity of the Puchov people shows that opinion is divided between those who attribute the culture to a Celtic group – the Boii or Cotini are the leading candidates – and those who favour a Germanic group, e.g., the Buri. Despite wide acknowledgement of Dacian influence, there is little support for the view that the people of this region were ethnic Dacians.

===== Poland =====
The hypothesis of a substantial Dacian population in the river Vistula basin is not widely supported among modern scholars, as this region is generally regarded as inhabited predominantly by Germanic tribes during the Roman imperial era, e.g., Heather (2009).

=== The fate of Dacian ===
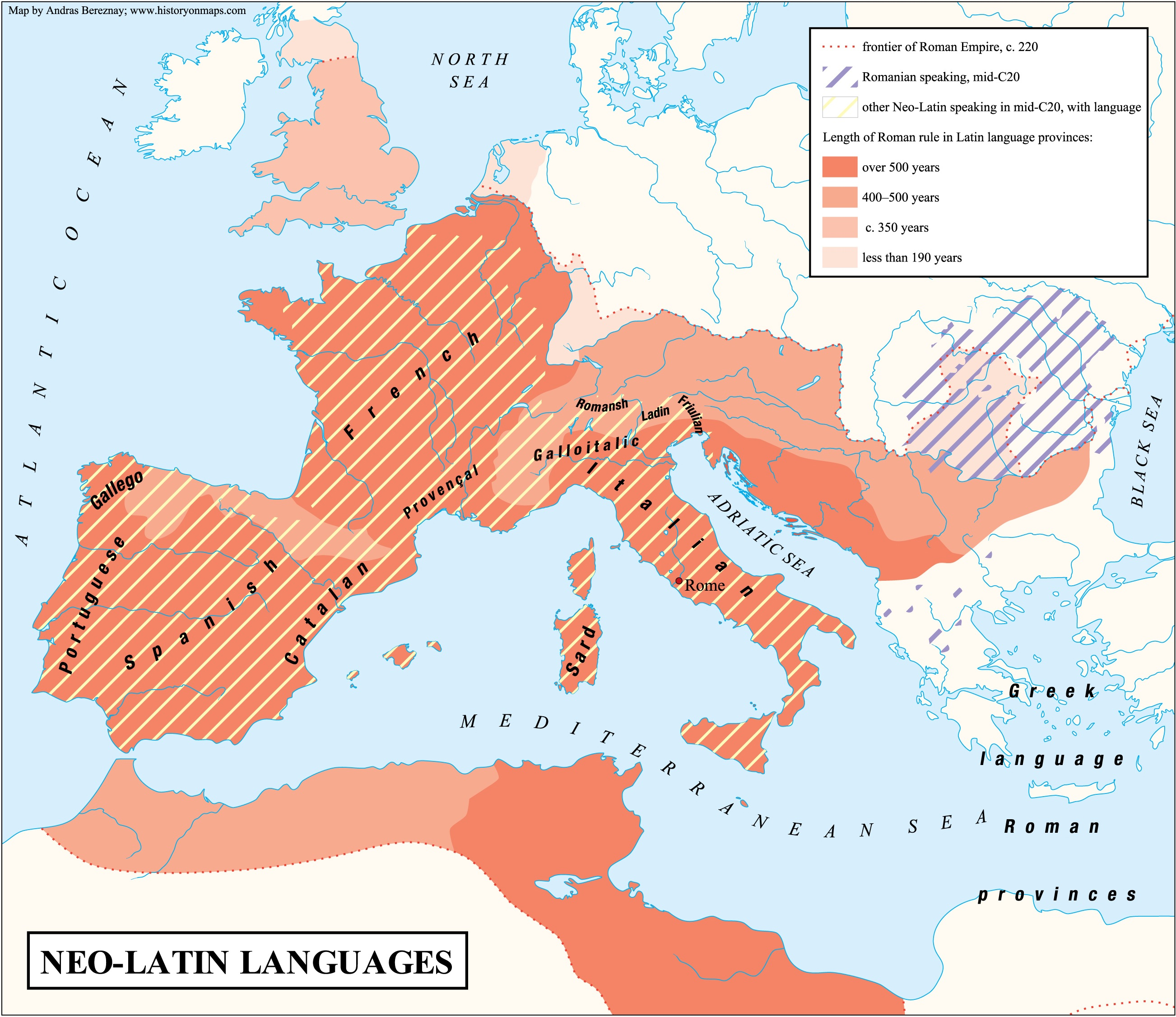
Map showing the time duration of Roman rule and the distribution of modern Romance languages. In particular, parts of Dacia had been under Roman rule (Roman Dacia) for c. 170 years.

From the earliest times that they are attested, Dacians lived on both sides of Danube and on both sides of the Carpathians, evidenced by the northern Dacian town Setidava. The first Roman conquest of part of Dacia did not extinguish the language, as Free Dacian tribes may have continued to speak Dacian in the area north-east of the Carpathians as late as the 6th or 7th century AD.

== Sound changes from Proto-Indo-European ==
Phonologically Dacian is a conservative Indo-European (IE) language. From the remaining fragments, the sound changes from Proto-Indo-European (PIE) to Dacian can be grouped as follows:

=== Short vowels ===
1. PIE *a and *o appear as a.
2. PIE accented *e, appears as ye in open syllable or ya in closed ones. Otherwise, PIE un-accented *e remains e.
3. PIE *i was preserved in Dacian as i.

=== Long vowels ===
1. PIE *ē and *ā appear as *ā
2. PIE *ō was preserved as *ō

=== Diphthongs ===
1. PIE *ai was preserved as *ai
2. PIE *oi appears in Dacian as *ai
3. PIE *ei evolution is not well reconstructed yet. It appears to be preserved to ei or that already passed to i.
4. PIE *wa was preserved as *wa.
5. PIE *wo appears as *wa.
6. PIE *we was preserved as *we.
7. PIE *wy appears as *vi.
8. PIE *aw was preserved as *aw.
9. PIE *ow appears as *aw.
10. PIE *ew was preserved as *ew.

=== Consonants ===
Like many IE stocks, Dacian merged the two series of voiced stops.

1. Both *d and *d^{h} became d,
2. Both *g and *g^{h} became g
3. Both *b and *b^{h} became b
4. PIE *ḱ became ts
5. PIE *ǵ became dz
6. PIE *kʷ when followed by e, i became t̠ʃ. Otherwise became k. Same fate for PIE cluster *kw.
7. PIE *gʷ and *gʷ^{h} when followed by e or i became d̠ʒ. Otherwise became g. Same fate for PIE cluster *gw
8. PIE *m, *n, *p, *t, *r, *l were preserved.

Note: In the course of the diachronic development of Dacian, a palatalisation of k and g appears to have occurred before front vowels according to the following process

- k > [kj] > [tj] > [tʃ] ~ [ts] ⟨ts⟩ or ⟨tz⟩ > [s] ~ [z] ⟨z⟩, e.g.: *ker(s)na is reflected by Tierna (Tabula Peutingeriana) Dierna (in inscriptions and Ptolemy), *Tsierna in station Tsiernen[sis], AD 157, Zernae (notitia Dignitatum), (colonia) Zernensis (Ulpian)
- g > [ɡj] > [dj] > [dz] ~ [z] ⟨z⟩, e.g.: Germisara appears as Γερμιζερα, with the variants Ζερμιζίργα, Ζερμίζιργα

== Vocabulary ==
=== Place names ===
Ptolemy gives a list of 43 names of towns in Dacia, out of which arguably 33 were of Dacian origin. Most of the latter included the suffix -dava, meaning settlement or village. But, other Dacian names from his list lack the suffix, for example Zarmisegethusa regia = Zermizirga, and nine other names of Dacian origin seem to have been Latinised.

The Dacian linguistic area is characterised mainly with composite names ending in -dava, or variations such as -deva, -daua, -daba, etc. The settlement names ending in these suffixes are geographically grouped as follows:

- In Dacia: Acidava, Argedava, Argidava, Buridava, Cumidava, Dokidaua, Karsidaua, Klepidaua, Markodaua, Netindaua, Patridaua, Pelendova, *Perburidava, Petrodaua, Piroboridaua, Rhamidaua, Rusidava, Sacidaba, Sangidaua, Setidava, Singidaua, Sykidaba, Tamasidaua, Utidaua, Zargidaua, Ziridava, Zucidaua – 26 names altogether.
- In Lower Moesia (the present northern Bulgaria) and Scythia Minor (Dobruja): Aedabe, *Buteridava, *Giridava, Dausdavua, Kapidaua, Murideba, Sacidava, Scaidava (Skedeba), Sagadava, Sukidaua (Sucidava) – 10 names in total.
- In Upper Moesia (the present districts of Nish, Sofia, and partly Kjustendil): Aiadaba, Bregedaba, Danedebai, Desudaba, Itadeba, Kuimedaba, Zisnudeba – 7 names in total.

Besides these regions, similar village names are found in three other places:

- Thermi-daua (Ptolemy), a town in Dalmatia, a Grecised form of *Germidava. This settlement was probably founded by immigrants from Dacia.
- Gil-doba—a village in Thrace, of unknown location.
- Pulpu-deva in Thrace—today Plovdiv in Bulgaria.

A number of Dacian settlements do not have the -dava ending or variant suffix. Some of these are: Acmonia, Aizis, Amutria, Apulon, Arcina, Arcobadara, Arutela, Berzobis, Brucla, Diacum, Dierna, Dinogetia, Drobeta, Egeta, Genucla, Malva (Romula), Napoca, Oescus, Patruissa, Pinon, Potaissa, Ratiaria, Sarmizegetusa, Tapae, Tibiscum, Tirista, Tsierna, Tyrida, Zaldapa, Zeugma and Zurobara.

=== Tribal names ===
In the case of Ptolemy's Dacia, most of the tribal names are similar to those on the list of civitates, with few exceptions.

=== Plant names ===
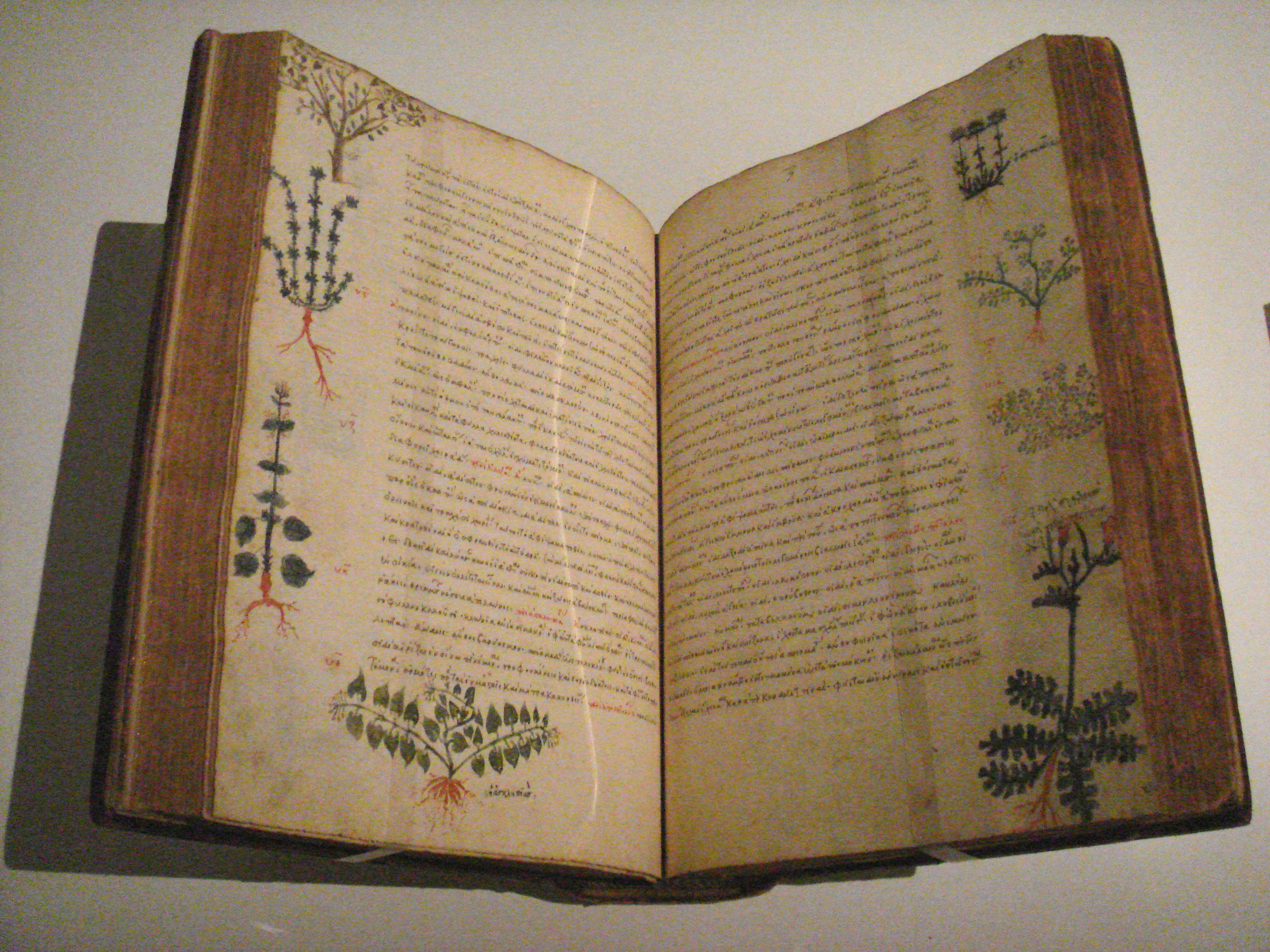
Dioscorides, De Materia Medica, Byzantium, 15th century.

In ancient literary sources, the Dacian names for a number of medicinal plants and herbs survive in ancient texts, including about 60 plant names in Dioscorides. The Greek physician Pedanius Dioscorides, of Anazarbus in Asia Minor, wrote the medical textbook De Materia Medica (Ancient Greek: Περὶ ὕλης ἰατρικῆς) in the mid-1st century AD. In Wellmann's opinion (1913), accepted by Russu (1967), the Dacian plant names were added in the 3rd century AD from a glossary published by the Greek grammarian Pamphilus of Alexandria (1st century AD). The Dacian glosses were probably added to the Pseudo-Apuleius texts by the 4th century. The mixture of indigenous Dacian, Latin and Greek words in the lists of Dacian plant names may be explained by a linguistic crossing process occurring in that period.

Although many Dacian toponyms have uncertain meanings, they are more reliable as sources of Dacian words than the names of medicinal plants provided by Dioscorides, which have led to speculative identifications: out of 57 plants, 25 identifications may be erroneous, according to Asher & Simpson. According to the Bulgarian linguist Decev, of the 42 supposedly Dacian plant names in Dioscorides only 25 are truly Dacian, while 10 are Latin and 7 Greek. Also, of the 31 "Dacian" plant names recorded by Pseudo-Apuleius, 16 are really Dacian, 9 are Latin and 8 are Greek.

Examples of common Dacian, Latin and Greek words in Pseudo-Apuleius:

- Dacian blis and Latin blitum (from Greek bliton for purple amaranth
- Dacian amolusta and Campanian amolocia for chamomile
- Dacian dracontos and Italic dracontes for rosemary

=== Reconstruction of Dacian words ===
Both Georgiev and Duridanov use the comparative linguistic method to decipher ancient Thracian and Dacian names, respectively. Georgiev (1977) argues that the meaning of an ancient placename in an unknown language can be deciphered by comparing it to its successor-names and to cognate placenames and words in other Indo-European languages, both ancient and modern. Georgiev considers decipherment by analysis of root-words alone to be devoid of scientific value. He gives several examples of his methodology, one of which refers to a town and river (a tributary of the Danube) in eastern Romania called Cernavodă, which in Slavic means "black water". The same town in antiquity was known as Ἀξίοπα (Axiopa) or Ἀξιούπολις (Axioupolis) and its river as the Ἀξιός (Axios). The working assumption is that Axiopa meant "black water" in Dacian, on the basis that Cernavodă is probably a calque of the ancient Dacian name. According to Georgiev, the likely IE root-word for Axios is *n̥-ks(e)y-no ("dark, black" cf. Avestan axsaena). On the basis of the known rules of formation of IE composite words, Axiopa would break down as axi = "black" and opa or upa = "water" in Dacian; the -polis element is ignored, as it is a Greek suffix meaning "city". The assumption is then validated by examining cognate placenames. There was another Balkan river also known in antiquity as Axios, whose source was in the Dacian-speaking region of Moesia: its modern Macedonian name is Crna reka (Slavic for "black river"): although it was in Dardania (Rep. of North Macedonia), a mainly Illyrian-speaking region. Georgiev considers this river-name to be of Daco-Moesian origin. The axi element is also validated by the older Greek name for the Black Sea, Ἄξεινος πόντος – Axeinos pontos, later altered to the euphemism Εὔξεινος πόντος Euxeinos pontos meaning "Hospitable sea". The opa/upa element is validated by the Lithuanian cognate upė, meaning "water"). The second component of the town's name *-upolis may be a diminutive of *upa cf. Lithuanian diminutive upelis.

[N.B. This etymology was questioned by Russu: Axiopa, a name attested to only in Procopius' De Aedificiis, may be a corrupted form of Axiopolis. However, even if correct, Russu's objection is irrelevant: it does not affect the interpretation of the axi- element as meaning "black", or the upa as meaning "water" cf. placename Scenopa. Fraser (1959) noted that the root axio that occurs in the place-name Axiopa is also found in Samothrace and in Sparta, where Athena Axiopoina was worshiped. Therefore, he considers this pre-Greek root to be of Thracian origin, meaning "great". However, there is no certainty that the axi element in Greece was of Thracian (as opposed to Greek or other language), or that it meant "great" rather than "black". In any case, this objection may not be relevant, if Thracian was a separate language to Dacian].

Some linguists are skeptical of this reconstruction methodology of Dacian. The phonetic systems of Dacian and Thracian and their evolution are not reconstructed directly from indigenous elements but from their approximative Greek or Latin transcripts. Greek and Latin had no dedicated graphic signs for phonemes such as č, ġ, ž, š and others. Thus, if a Thracian or Dacian word contained such a phoneme, a Greek or Latin transcript would not represent it accurately. The etymologies that are adduced to back up the proposed Dacian and Thracian vowel and consonant changes, used for word reconstruction with the comparative method, are open to divergent interpretations because the material is related to place names, with the exception of Dacian plant names and the limited number of glosses. Because of this, there are divergent and even contradictory assumptions for the phonological structure and development of the Dacian and Thracian languages. It is doubtful that the Dacian phonological system has been accurately reproduced by Greek or Latin transcripts of indigenous lexica.

In the case of personal names, the choice of the etymology is often a matter of compliance with assumed phonological rules. Since the geographical aspect of the occurrence of sound changes (i.e. o > a) within Thracian territory, based on the work of V. Georgiev, began to be emphasised by some researchers, the chronological aspect has been somewhat neglected. There are numerous cases where lack of information has obscured the vocalism of these idioms, generating the most contradictory theories. Today, some 3,000 Thraco-Dacian lexical units are known. In the case of the oscillation *o / *a, the total number of words containing it is about 30, many more than the ones cited by both Georgiev and Russu, and the same explanation is not valid for all of them.

In 2024, Robert Eggers' remake of Nosferatu utilized Dacian in several instances of Count Orlok's dialogue (played by Bill Skarsgård). This was done with the consultation of Romanian screenwriter Florin Lăzărescu.

== See also ==
List articles

- List of ancient cities in Thrace and Dacia
- List of Dacian kings
- List of Dacian names
- List of Dacian plant names
- List of Dacian towns
- List of reconstructed Dacian words
- Substrate in Romanian

Other articles

- Albanian language
- Daco-Thracian
- Davae
- Megleno-Romanian language
- Thracian language
- Thraco-Roman
- Paleo-Balkan languages
- Phrygian language
- Scythian languages
- Sinaia lead plates

== Works cited ==
=== Ancient ===
- Dioscorides, Pedanius (ed.). De materia medica.
- Pliny, the elder (2000) [77–79 AD]. Natural history Volume 2, Issues 3–7. Harvard University Press.
- Pseudo-Apuleius (ed.). De Herbarum Virtutibus.
- Ptolemy (ed.). Geographia.
- Strabo. Geographica.
- Tacitus (ed.). Germania.
- Tacitus. Histories.

=== Modern ===
- Academic American encyclopedia. Vol. 10. Grolier Incorporated. 1994. p. 198. ISBN 978-0-7172-2053-3.
- Almássy, Katalin (2006). "Celts and Dacians(?) In the Great Hungarian Plain 1st c. BC to 1st c. AD" (PDF). In Salac, V.; Bemman, J. (eds.). Mitteleuropa in Zeit Marbods.
- Antoniewicz, Jerzy (1966). "Tribal Territories of the Baltic People in the Hallstatt – La Tène and Roman Periods in the Light of Archaeology and Toponymy". Acta Baltico-Slavica. 4–5.
- Appel, René; Muysken, Pieter (2006). Language Contact and Bilangualism. Amsterdam University Press. ISBN 978-90-5356-857-6.
- Asenova, Petja (1999). Bulgarian in Handbuch der Südosteuropa-Linguistik. Wiesbaden, Harrassowitz. ISBN 978-3-447-03939-0.
- Asher, R. E.; Simpson, J. M. Y. (1994). The Encyclopedia of Language and Linguistics. Vol. 3. Pergamon Press. ISBN 978-0-08-035943-4.
- Avery, Catherine (1972). The New Century handbook of classical geography. Appleton-Century-Crofts.
- Baldi, Philip (1983). An Introduction to the Indo-European Languages. Southern Illinois University Press. ISBN 978-0-8093-1091-3.
- Batty, Roger (2007). Rome and the Nomads. The Pontic-Danubian Realm in Antiquity. Oxford University Press. ISBN 978-019814936-1.
- Bazovski, Igor (2008), Celts, the Iron Age Warriors (summary of review), SNM (Slovak National Museum)
- "The Beginnings of the History of the Romanian People". Anale de Istorie (4). 1976. ISSN 1010-5506.
- Berenger, Jean (1994). A History of the Habsburg Empire 1273–1700. Longman Group United Kingdom. ISBN 978-0-582-09009-5.
- Berindei, Dan; Candea, Virgil (2001). Mostenirea timpurilor indepartate (in Romanian). Editura Enciclopedica. ISBN 978-973450381-0.
- Best, Jan G. P.; de Vries, Nanny M. W., eds. (1989). Thracians and Mycenaeans: Proceedings of the Fourth International Congress of Thracology Rotterdam, 24–26 September 1984. Brill Academic. ISBN 978-90-04-08864-1.
- Boia, Lucian (2001). History and Myth in Romanian Consciousness. Central European University Press. pp. 103–105. ISBN 963-9116-97-1.
- Bolovan, Ioan; Constantiniu, Florin; Michelson, Paul E.; et al. (1997). Treptow, Kurt (ed.). A History of Romania. East European Monographs. ISBN 978-0-88033-345-0.
- Bosworth, A.B. (1980). A Historical Commentary on Arrian's History of Alexander Volume 1: Commentary on Books I-III. Oxford: Clarendon Press. ISBN 978-019814828-9.
- Bowman, Alan K.; Champlin, Edward; Lintott, Andrew, eds. (1996). The Cambridge Ancient History. Vol. 10. Cambridge University Press. ISBN 978-052126430-3.
- Brixhe, Claude (1994). "Le Phrygien". In Bader, Fr (ed.). Langues indo-européennes (in French). Paris: CNRS Éditions. pp. 165–178. ISBN 978-227105043-4.
- Brixhe, Claude (2008). "Phrygian". In Woodard, Roger D. (ed.). The Ancient Languages of Asia Minor. Cambridge University Press. ISBN 978-0-521-68496-5.
- Bulei, Ion (2005). A short history of Romania. Bucharest; Meronia Publishers. ISBN 978-973-9884-41-9.
- Bunbury, Sir Edward Herbert (1979) [First published 1883]. A history of ancient geography among the Greeks and Romans: from the earliest ages till the fall of the Roman Empire. Vol. 2. J. C. Gieben.
- Bynon, Thelma (1974). Historical Linguistics.
- Campbell, George L. (1998). Concise Compendium of the World's Languages. London: Routledge. ISBN 978-0-415-16049-0.
- Carnap-Bornheim, Claus (2003). Kontakt, Kooperation, Konflikt: Germanen und Sarmaten zwischen dem 1. und dem 4. Jahrhundert nach Christus (in German). Wachholtz. ISBN 978-352901871-8.
- Childe, V. Gordon (1930). The Bronze Age. Biblo & Tannen Publishers. ISBN 978-0-8196-0123-0.
- "Congrese Dacologie: Dacia Revival". Archived from the original on 15 July 2012.
- Crossland, R.A. (1982). "Linguistic problems of the Balkan area in the late prehistoric and early Classical period". In Boardman, John (ed.). The Cambridge Ancient History Volume 3, Part 1. Cambridge University Press. ISBN 978-0-521-22496-3.
- Daicoviciu, Hadrian (1972). Dacii (in Romanian). Editura Enciclopedică Română.
- "Dėl žynio Žalmokšio vardo kilmės". Vydos Vartai Yogi.lt (in Lithuanian). 3 April 2012.
- DEX (in Romanian). Institute of Linguistics of the Romanian Academy. 2016. ISBN 978-606-704-161-3.
- Demiraj, Shaban (2006). The origin of the Albanians (linguistically investigated). Tirana: Academy of Sciences of Albania. ISBN 978-99943-817-1-5.
- Dobiáš, Josef (1964). Dějiny československého území před vystoupením Slovanů. Nakl. Československé akademie věd.
- Du Nay, André (1977). The early history of the Rumanian language. ISBN 978-093310403-7 – via Internet Archive.
- Dumitrescu, V.L.; Bolomey, A.; Mogosanu, F. (1982). "The Prehistory of Romania: from the earliest times to 1000 B.C". In Boardman, John; Edwards, I. E. S.; Hammond, N.G.L.; Sollberger, E. (eds.). The Cambridge Ancient History. Vol. 3. Cambridge University Press. ISBN 978-0-521-22496-3.
- Duridanov, Ivan (1969). Die Thrakisch- und Dakisch-Baltischen Sprachbeziehungen (in German).
- Duridanov, Ivan (1976). Езикът на Траките [The language of the Thracians] (in Bulgarian).
- Duridanov, Ivan (1985). Die Sprache der Thraker [The language of the Thracians]. Bulgarische Sammlung (in German). Vol. 5. Hieronymus Verlag. ISBN 3-88893-031-6.
- Edwards, I. E. S.; Gadd, C. J.; Hammond, N. G. L. (1971). The Cambridge Ancient History. Volume 1, Part 2: Early History of the Middle East. Cambridge University Press. ISBN 978-0-521-07791-0 – via Internet Archive.
- Ehrich, Robert W. (1970). Some Indo-European Speaking Groups of the Middle. Danube and the Balkans: Their Boundaries as Related to Cultural Geography Through Time. University of Pennsylvania Press.
- Fisher, Iancu (2003). Les substrats et leur influence sur les langues romanes: la Romania du Sud-Est / Substrate und ihre Wirkung auf die romanischen Sprachen: Sudostromania in Romanische Sprachgeschichte (in French). Mouton De Gruyter. ISBN 978-3-11-014694-3.
- Fol, Alexander (1996). Thracians, Celts, Illyrians and Dacians in History of Humanity: From Seventh Century B.C. to the Seventh Century A.D. Bernan Assoc. ISBN 978-92-3-102812-0.
- Fraser, P.M (1959). Samothrace: no. 1. The inscriptions on stone edited by Karl Lehmann, Phyllis Williams Lehmann. Pantheon Books.
- Friedman, Victor A. (2020). "The Balkans". In Evangelia Adamou, Yaron Matras (ed.). The Routledge Handbook of Language Contact. Routledge Handbooks in Linguistics. Routledge. pp. 385–403. ISBN 9781351109147.
- Friedman, Victor (2022). "The Balkans". In Salikoko Mufwene, Anna Maria Escobar (ed.). The Cambridge Handbook of Language Contact: Volume 1: Population Movement and Language Change. Cambridge Handbooks in Language and Linguistics. Cambridge University Press. ISBN 9781009115773.
- Georgiev, Vladimir (1960). "Raporturile dintre limbile dacă, tracă şi frigiană". Studii Clasice (in Romanian). II: 39–58.
- Georgiev, Vladimir (1972). "The Earliest Ethnological Situation of the Balkan Peninsula as Evidenced by Linguistic and Onomastic Data". Aspects of the Balkans: continuity and change edited by Birnbaum Henrik and Vryonis Speros. Mouton.
- Georgiev, Vladimir (1977). Trakite i technijat ezik/Les Thraces et leur langue [The Thracians and their language] (in Bulgarian and French). Sofia, Bulgaria: Izdatelstvo na Bălgarskata Akademija na naukite.
- Georgiev, Vladimir (1981). Introduction to the history of the Indo-European languages. Bulgarian Academy. ISBN 978-953517261-1.
- Gimbutas, Marija (1963). "Linguistic and Historic Background". the Balts. London: Thames & Hudson. Archived from the original on 4 February 2012.
- Giurescu, Constantin C.; Giurescu, Dinu C. (1974). Istoria Românilor: Din cele mai vechi timpuri pînă la întemeierea statelor românești (in Romanian). Editura Stiintifica.
- Gruen, Erich S. (2011). Rethinking the Other in Antiquity. Princeton University Press. ISBN 978-069114852-6.
- Heather, Peter, ed. (1999). The Visigoths from the Migration Period to the Seventh Century: An Ethnographic Perspective. The Boydell Press / Center for Interdisciplinary Research on Social Stress. ISBN 978-085115762-7.
- Heather, Peter (2009). Empires and Barbarians: The Fall of Rome and the Birth of Europe. Oxford and New York: Oxford University Press. ISBN 978-0-19-989226-6.
- Heather, Peter (2010). Empires and Barbarians: Migration, Development, and the Birth of Europe. Oxford University Press. ISBN 978-0-19-973560-0.
- Hehn, Victor (1976) [First published 1885]. Cultivated plants and domesticated animals in their migration from Asia to Europe: historico-linguistic studies. Amsterdam Classics in Linguistics, 1800–1925. Vol. 7. John Benjamins. doi:10.1075/acil.7. ISBN 978-90-272-0871-2.; originally Culturpflanzen und Haustiere in ihrem Übergang aus Asien nach Griechenland und Italien sowie das übrige Europa: Historisch-linguistische Skizzen. Berlin: Gebr. Borntraeger, 1885
- Hoddinott, R.F. (1989). "Thracians, Mycenaeans and 'The Trojan Question'". In Best, Jan G. P.; de Vries, Nanny M. W. (eds.). Thracians and Mycenaeans: Proceedings of the Fourth International Congress of Thracology Rotterdam, 24–26 September 1984. Brill Academic. ISBN 978-90-04-08864-1.
- Hrushevskyi, Mykhailo (1997). History of Ukraine-Rus'. Canadian Institute of Ukrainian Studies Press. ISBN 978-1-895571-19-6.
- Hyllested, Adam; Joseph, Brian D. (2022). "Albanian". In Olander, Thomas (ed.). The Indo-European Language Family : A Phylogenetic Perspective. Cambridge University Press. pp. 223–245. doi:10.1017/9781108758666. ISBN 9781108758666. S2CID 161016819.
- "Image". Archived from the original on 30 September 2007.
- Jones, A. H. M. (1964). The Later Roman Empire, 284–602. Oxford: Basil Blackwell.
- Katičić, Radoslav; Križman, Mate (1976). Ancient languages of the Balkans. The Hague; Paris: Mouton – via Internet Archive.
- Lengyel, Alfonz; Radan, George T.; Barkóczi, László; Bónis, Eva B. (1980). Lengyel, Alfonz; Radan, George (eds.). The Archaeology of Roman Pannonia. University Press of Kentucky. ISBN 978-081311370-8.
- Lloshi, Xhevat (1999). "Albanian". In Hinrichs, Uwe (ed.). Handbuch der Südosteuropa Linguistik (in German). Vol. 10. Harrassowitz. ISBN 978-344703939-0. (online?)
- Madgearu, Alexandu; Gordon, Martin (2007). The Wars of the Balkan Peninsula: Their Medieval Origins. Scarecrow Press. ISBN 978-0-8108-5846-6 – via Internet Archive.
- Magocsi, Paul R.; Pop, Ivan (2002). Encyclopedia of Rusyn History and Culture. University of Toronto Press. ISBN 978-080203566-0.
- Mallory, J. P. (1989). In Search of the Indo-Europeans: Language, Archaeology, and Myth. Thames and Hudson. ISBN 978-050005052-1 – via Internet Archive.
- Mattern, Susan P. (2002). Rome and the Enemy: Imperial Strategy in the Principate. Berkeley, California: University of California Press. ISBN 0-520-23683-1.
- Mayer, H.E. (1992). "Dacian and Thracian as southern Baltoidic". Lituanus. 38 (2). ISSN 0024-5089. Archived from the original on 16 December 2017.
- Mayer, H.E. (1996). "South Baltic". Lituanus. 42 (2). Archived from the original on 13 May 2021.
- Mayer, H.E. (1997). "Balts and Carpathians". Lituanus. 43 (2). Archived from the original on 13 May 2021.
- Mayer, H.E. (1999). "Dr. Harvey E. Mayer, February 1999".
- McHenry, Robert, ed. (1993). The New Encyclopaedia Britannica: Macropaedia. Encyclopædia Britannica. ISBN 978-0-85229-571-7.
- Mielczarek, Mariusz (1989). Ancient Greek coins found in Central, Eastern, and Northern Europe. Zakład Narodowy Imienia Ossolińskich. ISBN 83-04-03042-X.
- Mihailov, G (2008). "Thrace before the Persian entry into Europe". The Cambridge Ancient History. Vol. 3 Part 2. Cambridge University Press. ISBN 978-052122717-9.
- Milewski, Tadeusz (1969). Teils. Panstwowe Wydawn Naukowe, Poland.
- Mocsy, Andras (1974). Pannonia and Upper Moesia: History of the Middle Danube Provinces of the Roman Empire. Routledge & Kegan Paul Books. ISBN 978-0-7100-7714-1.
- Momigliano, Arnaldo (1984) [First published 1960]. Secondo contributo alla storia degli studi classici (in English and Italian). Rome: Edizioni di Storia e Letteratura. ISBN 978-888498846-1.
- Mountain, Harry (1998). The Celtic Encyclopedia. Universal Publishers. ISBN 978-1-58112-890-1.
- Müllenhoff, Karl (1856). Ueber die Weltkarte und Chorographie des Kaiser Augustus: Feier des Geburtstatges seiner Majestät des Konigs Frederik's VII (in German). Kiel Druck von C.F. Mohr.
- Muller, Karl, ed. (1883). Claudi Ptolomaei Geographia.
- Nandris, John (1976). "The Dacian Iron Age A Comment in a European Context". Festschrift für Richard Pittioni zum siebzigsten Geburtstag. Wien, Deuticke, Horn, Berger. ISBN 978-3-7005-4420-3.
- Nicolet, Claude (1991). Space, Geography, and Politics in the Early Roman Empire. Univ of Michigan. ISBN 978-0-472-10096-5 – via Internet Archive.
- Oltean, Ioana Adina (2007). Dacia: landscape, colonisation and romanisation. Routledge. ISBN 978-0-415-41252-0.
- Opreanu, C. (1997). "Roman Dacia and its barbarian neighbours. Economic and diplomatic relations". Roman frontier studies 1995: proceedings of the XVIth International Congress of Roman Frontier Studies. Oxbow. pp. 247–252. ISBN 978-190018847-0.
- Paliga, Sorin (1986). The social structure of the South-East European Societies in the Middle Ages. A Linguistic View. Vol. s 26–29. Linguistica.
- Panayotou, A. (2007). "Greek and Thracian". A History of Ancient Greek: From the Beginnings to Late Antiquity. Cambridge University Press. ISBN 978-0-521-83307-3.
- Papazoglu, Fanula (1978). The Central Balkan Tribes in Pre-Roman Times: Triballi, Autariatae, Dardanians, Scordisci, & Moesians. Translated by Stansfield-Popovic, Mary. John Benjamins North America. ISBN 978-90-256-0793-7.
- Pelletier, André (1985). La Médecine en Gaule: villes d'eaux, sanctuaires des eaux (in French). Paris: Picard. ISBN 978-270840115-0.
- Petrescu-Dîmbovița, Mircea (1978). Scurta istorie a Daciei Preromane. Junimea.
- Pieta, Karol (1982). Die Puchov Kultur. Archäologisches Institut der Slowakischen Akademie der Wissenschaften zu Nitra. pp. 204–209.
- Poghirc, Cicerone (1983). Frisch, Helmut (ed.). Philologica et linguistica: ausgewählte Aufsätze (1953–1983). N. Brockmeyer. ISBN 388339356-8.
- Poghirc, Cicerone (1986). "Dioscoride et Pseudo-Apulee Temoins des debuts de la differenciation dans la Romania". Linguistique générale et linguistique romane: histoire de la grammaire: actes du XVIIe Congrès international de linguistique et philologie romanes, Aix-en-Provence, 29 août-3 septembre 1983 (in French). Wechselnde Verleger.
- Poghirc, Cicerone (1989). "Considerations chrono-geographiques sur l'oscillation a/o en Thrace et en Daco-Mesien". In Best, Jan G. P.; de Vries, Nanny M. W. (eds.). Thracians and Mycenaeans: Proceedings of the Fourth International Congress of Thracology Rotterdam, 24–26 September 1984. Brill Academic. ISBN 978-90-04-08864-1.
- Polomé, Edgar C. (1982). "Balkan Languages (Illyrian, Thracian and Daco-Moesian)". In Boardman, John (ed.). Cambridge Ancient History. Volume 3, Part 1, The Prehistory of the Balkans, the Middle East and the Aegean World, Tenth to Eighth Centuries BC (2nd ed.). pp. 866–888. ISBN 978-0-521-22496-3.
- Polomé, Edgar C. (1983). "The Linguistic Situation in the Western Provinces of the Roman Empire". In Haase, Wolfgang (ed.). Sprache Und Literatur (Sprachen Und Schriften). Walter de Gruyter. pp. 509–553. ISBN 978-3-11-009525-8.
- Pop, Ioan Aurel; Nägler, Thomas, eds. (2005). The History of Transylvania: Until 1541. Romanian Cultural Institute. ISBN 978-973-7784-00-1.
- Popescu-Spineni, Marin (1987). Rumänien in seinen geographischen und kartographischen Quellen: vom Altertum bis an die Schwelle unseres Jahrhunderts [Romania in geographical and cartographic sources from ancient times to the turn of our century] (in German). O. Harassowitz. ISBN 978-3-447-02582-9.
- Poultney, James W. (1968). "Introduzione alia storia delle Iingue indeuropee by Vladimir I. Georgiev, 1966. Reviewed by James W. Poultney". Language. 44: 334–342. doi:10.2307/411629. JSTOR 411629.
- Price, Glanville, ed. (1998). An Encyclopedia of the Languages of Europe. Wiley–Blackwell. ISBN 978-063119286-2.
- Rădulescu, Mircea-Mihai (1984). "Illyrian, Thracian, Daco-Mysian, the substratum of Romanian and Albanian". Journal of Indo-European Studies. ISSN 0092-2323.
- Rădulescu, Mircea-Mihai (1987). "The Indo-European position of Illyrian, Daco-Mysian and Thracian: A historica-methodological approach". Journal of Indo-European Studies. ISSN 0092-2323.
- Renfrew, A.C. (1987). Archaeology and Language: The Puzzle of Indo-European Origins (First ed.). Cambridge University Press. ISBN 978-052135432-5.
- Renfrew, Colin (1990). Archaeology and Language: The Puzzle of Indo-European Origins (reprint ed.). Cambridge University Press. ISBN 978-052138675-3.
- de Rosales, Jurate, ed. (2015). Europos šaknys [European Roots] (in Lithuanian). Versmė. ISBN 978-609814816-9.
- de Rosales, Jurate, ed. (2020). Las raíces de Europa [European Roots] (in Spanish). Kálathos ediciones. ISBN 978-841218614-7.
- Rosetti, A. (1982). La linguistique Balkanique in Revue roumaine de linguistique (in French). Vol. 27. Editions de l'Academie de la RSR.
- Rosetti, Alexandru (1978). Istoria limbii române: De la origini pina in sec XVII (in Romanian). Editura Stiintifica si Enciclopedica.
- Rosetti, Alexandru; Graur, Alexandru (1969). Istoria limbii române. Vol. 2. Editura Academiei Romania.
- Russu, I. I. (1967). Limba traco-dacilor. Bucharest: Editura Ştiinţifică.
- Russu, Ion Iosif (1963). "Die Ortsnamen der Balkanhalbinsel in De Aedificiis". Revue de Linguistique. VIII: 123–132.
- Russu, Ion Iosif (1969). Die Sprache der Thrako-Daker (in German).
- Săvescu, Napoleon. "Noi nu suntem urmașii Romei" (in Romanian).
- Schütte, Gudmund (1917). Ptolemy's maps of northern Europe: a reconstruction of the prototypes. H. Hagerup – via Internet Archive.
- Schütte, Gudmund (1952). "A Ptolemaic Riddle Solved". Classica et Mediaevalia. Vol. 13 (1st ed.). Gyldendal.
- "Search: 'AE+1905%2C+00014'". Epigraphik-Datenbank Clauss / Slaby EDCS. Archived from the original on 29 April 2012.
- Shashi, Shyam Singh (1992). Encyclopaedia of humanities and social sciences. Vol. 25. Anmol Publications.
- Shchukin, Mark B. (1989). Rome and the Barbarians in Central and Eastern Europe: 1st Century B.C. – 1st Century A.D. B.A.R. International Series. Oxford: BAR Publishing. ISBN 978-086054690-0.
- Shelley, William Scott (1997). The Origins of the Europeans: Classical Observations in Culture and Personality. International Scholars Publications. ISBN 978-157309221-0.
- Strabo (1917–1961) [c. AD 20]. Jones, Horace Leonard (ed.). The geography of Strabo. Loeb Classical Library 49, 50, 182, 196, 211, 223, 241, 267. Vol. 1. Translated by Jones, Horace Leonard; Sterrett, John Robert Sitlington. William Heinemann and Harvard University Press – via Internet Archive.
- "Strabo Geography, Book VII, Chapter 3".
- Tacheva, Margarita (1997). "The Thracian Bessi domo et militiae". Živa Antika – Antiquité Vivante. Skopje: Živa antika. ISSN 0514-7727.
- Talbert, Richard J.A., ed. (2000). Barrington Atlas of the Greek and Roman World. Princeton University Press. ISBN 978-069103169-9.
- Taylor, Timothy (2001). "Northeastern European Iron Age, Dacian". Encyclopedia of prehistory (1st ed.). Springer. ISBN 978-030646258-0.
- Theodossiev, Nikola (2000). North-Western Thrace from the Fifth to First Centuries BC. British Archaeological Reports International Series. BAR Publishing. ISBN 978-184171060-0.
- Toma, Corina (2007). "Repertoriu orientativ al descoperirilor dacice de pe teritoriul Ungariei" [A Catalogue of the Dacian Period Discoveries Found in the Territory of Hungary]. Crisia (in Romanian and English). Muzeul Ţării Crişurilor: 65–77. ISSN 1016-2798.
- Tomaschek, Wilhelm (1883). "Les Restes de la langue dace". Le Muséon (in French). 2. Louvain, Belgium: Société des lettres et des sciences.
- Toporov, Vladimir Nikolayevich (1973). К фракийско-балтийским языковым параллелям. [Towards Thracian-Baltic language parallels] (in Russian). Balkan linguistics [Балканское языкознание]. pp. 51–52.
- Trask, Robert Lawrence (2000). Dictionary of Historical and Comparative Linguistics. Edinburgh University Press. ISBN 978-0-7486-1001-3.
- Turnvvald, K. (1968). Die Balten des vorgeschichtlichen Mitteleuropas (in German). Riga.
- Twist, Clint (2001). Raftery, Barry (ed.). Philip's Atlas of the Celts. London: George Philip. ISBN 978-0-5400-7880-6.
- Urbańczyk, Przemyslaw (1997). Origins of Central Europe. Warsaw. ISBN 83-85463-56-9.
- Urbańczyk, Przemysław, ed. (2001). Europe Around the Year 1000. Institute of Archeology and Ethnology; Polish Academy of Sciences. ISBN 978-837181211-8.
- Van Antwerp Fine, John (2000). The early medieval Balkans: a critical survey from the sixth to the late twelfth century. Ann Arbor: Univ. of Michigan Press. ISBN 978-0-472-08149-3.
- Visy, Z. (1995). "Luftbildarchäologie am römischen Limes in Ungarn". In Kunow, J. (ed.). Luftbildarchäologie in Ost- und Mitteleuropa. Forschungen zur Archäologie im Land Brandenburg (in German). Brandenburgisches Landesamt für Denkmalpflege. pp. 213–218. ISBN 978-391001108-3.
- Vyčinienė, Daiva. "Relationships Between Lithuanian And Balkan Schwebungs-Diaphonie: Interdisciplinary Search Key". p. 122.
- Wald, Lucia; Sluşanschi, Dan; Băltăceanu, Francisca (1987). Introducere în studiul limbii şi culturii indo-europene (in Romanian). Editura Științifică și Enciclopedică.
- Waldman, Carl; Mason, Catherine (2006). Encyclopedia of European Peoples. Facts on File. ISBN 978-0-8160-4964-6.
- Walters, E. Garrison (1988). The other Europe: Eastern Europe to 1945. Syracuse, NY: Syracuse University Press. ISBN 978-0-8156-2440-0.
- Witczak, Krzysztof Tomasz (1994). "Proto-Albanian and the problem of the Albanian nation". Bulletin de la Société polonaise de linguistique. 50–52.
