= False helleborine =

False helleborine is a name is used in different parts of the world to describe several different plants of either the Orchid family or the Lily family.

In the Orchid family it can refer to:

- Epipactis helleborine
- Epipactis atrorubens
- Epipactis gigantea

In the Lily family it is likely to refer to either:

- Veratrum album
- Veratrum californicum
- Veratrum nigrum
- Veratrum viride, giant false-helleborine

== See also ==
- Helleborine
- False hellebore
