= Vladimir I. Georgiev =

Bulgarian linguist (1908–1986)

- Владимир Георгиев
- Georgiev, c. 1980
- Born: 16 February 1908; Gabare, Principality of Bulgaria
- Died: 14 July 1986 (aged 78); Sofia, People's Republic of Bulgaria
- Education: Sofia University
- Known for: Contributions to Indo-European linguistics; Geogiev's law
- Scientific career
- Fields: linguistics, historical linguistics

Vladimir Ivanov Georgiev (Bulgarian: Владимир Иванов Георгиев; 16 February [O.S. 3 February] 1908 – 14 July 1986) was a Bulgarian linguist, philologist, and educational administrator.

== Biography ==
Vladimir Georgiev was born in the Bulgarian village of Gabare, near Byala Slatina and graduated in philology at Sofia University in 1930. He specialized in Indo-European, Slavic and general linguistics at the University of Vienna (1933–1934), and later at the universities of Berlin (1935–1936), Florence (1939–1940) and Paris (1946–1947). Assistant Professor at Sofia University (1931–1941), Associated Professor (1936–1945), Professor (1945), head of the department of general and comparative-historical linguistics at the Faculty of History and Philology at Sofia University (1948–1974), Dean of the Faculty of Philology (1947–1948), Vice-Rector (1948–1951), Rector (1951–1956). Director of the Institute for Bulgarian Academy of Sciences (1951–1957), Secretary of the Department of Linguistics, Literature and Art Studies (1956–1963), Vice-President of the Academy of Sciences (1959–1972), Director of the United Center for Language and Literature (from 1972). Chairman of the International Committee of Slavic Studies (1958–1963, since 1963 - Vice-President), President of the Bulgarian National Committee of Slavic Studies (since 1955). President of the International Association for the Study of Southeast Europe (1965–1967). Member of the Bureau of the Governing Board of the International Committee for Mycenology. Chief. editor of the "Short Encyclopedia of Bulgaria" (1962–1969), an encyclopedia "AZ" (1974), "Encyclopedia of Bulgaria" (1978). Editor of the magazine "Balkan Linguistics." Academician (1952). Honorary Doctor of Humboldt University in Berlin (1960) and Charles University in Prague (1968). Corresponding Member of the French Academy of Sciences (1967), the Finnish Academy of Sciences (1966), Saxon Academy of Sciences in Leipzig (1968), the Belgian Academy of Sciences (1971), Athens Academy of Sciences (1977).

In Balkan linguistics, Georgiev distinguished Thracian and Dacian from Phrygian and also determined the location of Thracian and Illyrian among other Indo-European languages. Based on a new application of comparative method, he established the existence of a Pre-Greek Indo-European language, which he called "Pelasgian". Georgiev is one of the first to contribute to the understanding of Minoan writing systems, especially Linear A. Georgiev's works were further developed by many scientists (Brandenstein, van Windekens, Carnot, Merling, Haas etc.). He made multiple contributions to the field of Thracology, including a linguistic interpretation of an inscription discovered at the village of Kyolmen in the Shoumen district of northeastern Bulgaria. In the 1960s, Georgiev examined the names of the twenty-six largest rivers of central and eastern Europe. He suggested that the names were reconstructible to Proto-Indo-European and that the Indo-European homeland was delimited on the west by the Rhine river and to the east by the Don river.

He also proposed in 1962 that the Etruscan language was related to Hittite, a theory which is not accepted by scholars.
