= George L. Campbell =

Scottish linguist (1912–2004)

- Born: 8 September 1912; Dingwall, Scotland
- Died: 15 December 2004 (aged 92); Brighton, England
- Education: University of Edinburgh; University of Leipzig; London University
- Employer: BBC World Service (1939–74)
- Known for: Polyglottism
- Notable work: Compendium of the World's Languages (1991)
- Spouse: Jen Porteous
- Children: 2

George L. Campbell (8 September 1912 – 15 December 2004) was a Scottish linguist who worked for the BBC World Service from 1939 to 1974. He spoke forty-four languages and had a working knowledge of around twenty more.

== Publications ==
- Campbell, George L. (1991). Compendium of the World's Languages. London: Routledge. ISBN 0-415-02937-6.
- Campbell, George L. (1995). Concise Compendium of the World's Languages. London: Routledge. ISBN 0-415-11392-X.
- Campbell, George L. (1997). Handbook of Scripts and Alphabets. London: Routledge. ISBN 0-415-13715-2.
