= False hellebore =

False hellebore is used as the common name of plants in two different families:

- Adonis vernalis (Ranunculaceae)
- Veratrum species (Melanthiaceae)

== See also ==
- Hellebore
