= Purple amaranth =

Purple amaranth is a common name for several plants in the genus Amaranthus and may refer to:

- Amaranthus blitum
- Amaranthus cruentus

== See also ==
- Aramanth purple
