= Thracian religion =

Religious beliefs and practices of the Thracians

The Thracian religion comprised the mythology, ritual practices and beliefs of the Thracians, a collection of closely related ancient Indo-European peoples who inhabited eastern and southeastern Europe and northwestern Anatolia throughout antiquity and who included the Thracians proper, the Getae, the Dacians, and the Bithynians.

The Thracians themselves did not leave any written corpus of their mythology and rituals, but information about their beliefs is nevertheless available through scarce references in various ancient Greek writings, as well as through epigraphic, iconographic and archaeological sources.

== Sources ==
There is little information available on the Thracians, which makes reconstructing their religious life uncertain and problematic. Epigraphic texts written in Greek form the only Thracian written evidence, although these were rare even in the Hellenistic period.

Imagery is a useful source on Thracian religion: coins were used as official royal propaganda, and images on imported luxuries such as tableware, jewellery, and weapons were used to communicate specific messages.

Information on Thracian religion is also obtainable via the archaeological analysis of cult, and evidence from the Roman period also provides knowledge on earlier Thracian religious ideas and practices.

=== Written ===
==== Textual ====
The main textual sources for Thracian religion come from Ancient Greek poets and writers, who were primarily interested in describing the mythology and philosophy of the Thracians rather than their cultic practices, due to which there is significant disparity in the amount of information recorded on Thracian myth compared to that of Thracian cult. Moreover, while these Greek sources recorded the names of some deities, the information they contain on Thracian religion is very fragmentary.

The earliest source on the religion of the ancient Thracians is the Greek historian Herodotus of Halicarnassus. However, Herodotus's writings combined descriptions of Thracian religious beliefs with Greek philosophical concepts so that it is difficult to disentangle them from each other, and they also described different practices belonging to specific regions or tribes, which themselves were few in number and were ambiguous in nature.

==== Epigraphic ====
Aside from compositions by ancient authors, inscriptions on stone are the main other source on ancient Thracian religion. These inscriptions are natively Thracian in origin, and are useful in providing information on the locations of sanctuaries, on the preferred depictions of the deities, as well as on Thracian devotees.

The earlier epigraphic sources on Thracian religion are from the 4th century BCE.

==== In the Odrysian kingdom ====
The region of Thrace for which there is the most comprehensive evidence for its religious practices is the Odrysian kingdom, which occupied the territory ranging from the Haemus Mons in the north to the Aegean Sea in the south, and from the Strymon river in the west to the Black Sea in the east. Information regarding religion within the Odrysian kingdom is recorded not only by Greek writers and playwrights, but also in inscriptions from Athens, Seuthopolis, Batkun and Vetren-Pistiros.

=== Archaeological ===
Archaeological research has provided a large amount of data on ancient Thrace, such as sites including settlements and cult places, burials, shrines, various deposits, objects depicting cultic scenes, and images like tomb paintings, coins, metal vessels, plaques, and jewellery.

== Attempts at reconstruction ==
The Greek gods Ares, Dionysos, and Hermes, were considered to have originated from Thrace in early scholarship until the decipherment of the Linear B script and etymological research provided evidence that they were all of Greek origin.

In the early 20th century, Gavril Katsarov based himself on dedications to Graeco-Roman deities to describe Thracian religion as having been "primitive and animistic" until it came into contact with Mediterranean religions traditions and borrowed Graeco-Roman religious concepts and iconography, and therefore as passively accepting more "sophisticated" religious practices from the Aegean world.

J. E. Fontenrose in the later 20th century had an assessment similar to that of Katsarov, describing Thracian religion as "crude and barbaric" before Greek influences transformed it, and positing that Thracian gods might have been "vaguely conceived" until they were individualised due to Greek influence.

Due to these earlier negative assessments, Thracian religion became under-studied academically, and therefore native Thracian religious concepts have been mostly ignored in studies, leaving pre-Roman Thracian cults largely unknown.

In the second half of the 20th century AD, Thracologists have attempted to draw from heterogeneous texts from different periods to reconstruct Thracian religion, such as the thesis of "Thracian Orphism" by Alexander Fol and Ivan Marazov.

Fol's and Marazov's thesis posits that the Thracian religion consisted of an oral doctrine about a universal principle which was one of harmony between the chthonic Zagreus and the solar Orpheus in the cosmogonic cycles created in the intercourse between the Mother-Goddess and her solar son, who was politically identified with the king. This doctrine would have constituted a parallel to the Greek Delphian reform, according to which Dionysos appears in the winter to replace an absent Apollo.

However, their use of sources from significantly later periods means their reconstruction has been criticised as unreliable, and the literary and material evidence regarding Thracian religion is too contradictory to allow for such a coherent reconstruction.

Fol's and Marazov's interpretation of the figures of Zalmoxis and Rhesus through an Orphic lens is also at odds with more recent findings on the Thracian afterlife, since Orphism saw the body and the soul as opposites whereby the soul was trapped by the body until it was released through death, while the Thracian afterlife conceived of a unity of the soul and the body which was preserved after death.

== Development ==
The earliest manifestations of the Thracian religion were from the Late Bronze Age and the Early Iron Age: the first trace of personified divine power in Thrace is from a Late Bronze Age stone slab depicting an ityphallic warrior in front of a "solar boat."

Stylised terracotta figurines bearing Central European influence have been discovered in the Inlaid Pottery culture of the Lower Danube, and schematic stone sculptures of warriors were used to mark the burial mounds of the nobility, being the result of steppe influence from the Pit-Grave culture in the Early Bronze Age.

The depiction of an ityphallic warrior fighting a snake-like monster swallowing the Sun on a stele from a sanctuary or a tombstone near present-day Razlog shows Mycenaean influence.

These Bronze Age images did not represent deities, but instead represented heroes or substitutes of men in mythological settings, and all of them showed foreign influences.

There is no evidence of deities being personified in Thrace during the Bronze Age. However, painted and engraved circles on Late Bronze Age ceramics might have been symbols of a solar cult, and human images have been found in sacred contexts as burial gifts and votive offerings in sanctuaries, including figurines made of clay, which were popular in Thrace during the whole Iron Age.

However, it was only in the 5th century BCE, when the Odrysian kingdom emerged and Greek emporia appeared in the Thracian heartland that the names of Thracian deities began to be recorded by Greeks in Thrace and that the first depictions of deities appeared in Thrace on goods imported from Greece.

== Cosmology ==
The account of Polyaenus of Bithynia, that the king Cosingas of the Cebrenii and Sycaeboae threatened to ascend by ladder to Heaven to complain about their disobedience to a goddess, suggests that the Thracians envisioned their deities as inhabiting the celestial realm.

That the king Kotys I celebrated sacrifices to the gods in symposia at places he had chosen which were shaded with trees and watered with springs also implies that Thracians believed their deities to be omnipresent.

=== Pantheon ===
The names of Thracian deities are not well-attested because of a taboo against mentioning them due to what was believed to be the ineffable nature of the deities, due to which the names of only some Thracian gods have been preserved. Greek sources identify some Thracian deities, although the information contained within them is fragmentary: these gods appeared primarily with Greek names due to the Hellenisation of the Thracian religion.

According to the Ancient Greek author Herodotus of Halicarnassus, the Thracians worshipped a pantheon of three deities, whom he identified, following the interpretatio Graeca, with the Greek gods without providing the Thracian names of these deities:

- Artemis, was the goddess of hunting;
- Ares, was the god of war;
- Dionysos, was the god of feasting with wine;
- a fourth Thracian god was identified by Herodotus with the Greek Hermes.

These four Thracian gods thus represented the activities of the Thracian aristocracy, among whom the indolent who fought war for prestige and feasted with wine were honoured, while agricultural work was derided.

The attested Thracian deities were worshipped by the Thracian elite, showing the political function of the Thracian religious cults.

The Thracian religion was aniconic, and representations of deities were present only on utilitarian artifacts, but not in sanctuaries save for those related to Greek cults in towns. This was similar to the Scythians, who also had no statues or altars and temples to their gods. Nevertheless, a comment by Xenophanes of Colophon, that the Thracian gods were red-haired and blue-eyed because mortals imagined their gods as alike to themselves, suggests that Thracians viewed their deities as being anthropomorphic in appearance.

Due to the various different names attributed by Ancient Greek authors to Thracian deities as well as the fragmented tribal social organisation of the Thracians, it is uncertain whether the Thracians had no common pantheon, or whether certain deities were simply known by different names across different parts of Thrace.

==== The Thracian "Hermes" ====
The Thracian "Hermes" was the progenitor of the kings: this god was worshipped supremely by the Thracian kings, who swore only by him.

==== Bendis ====
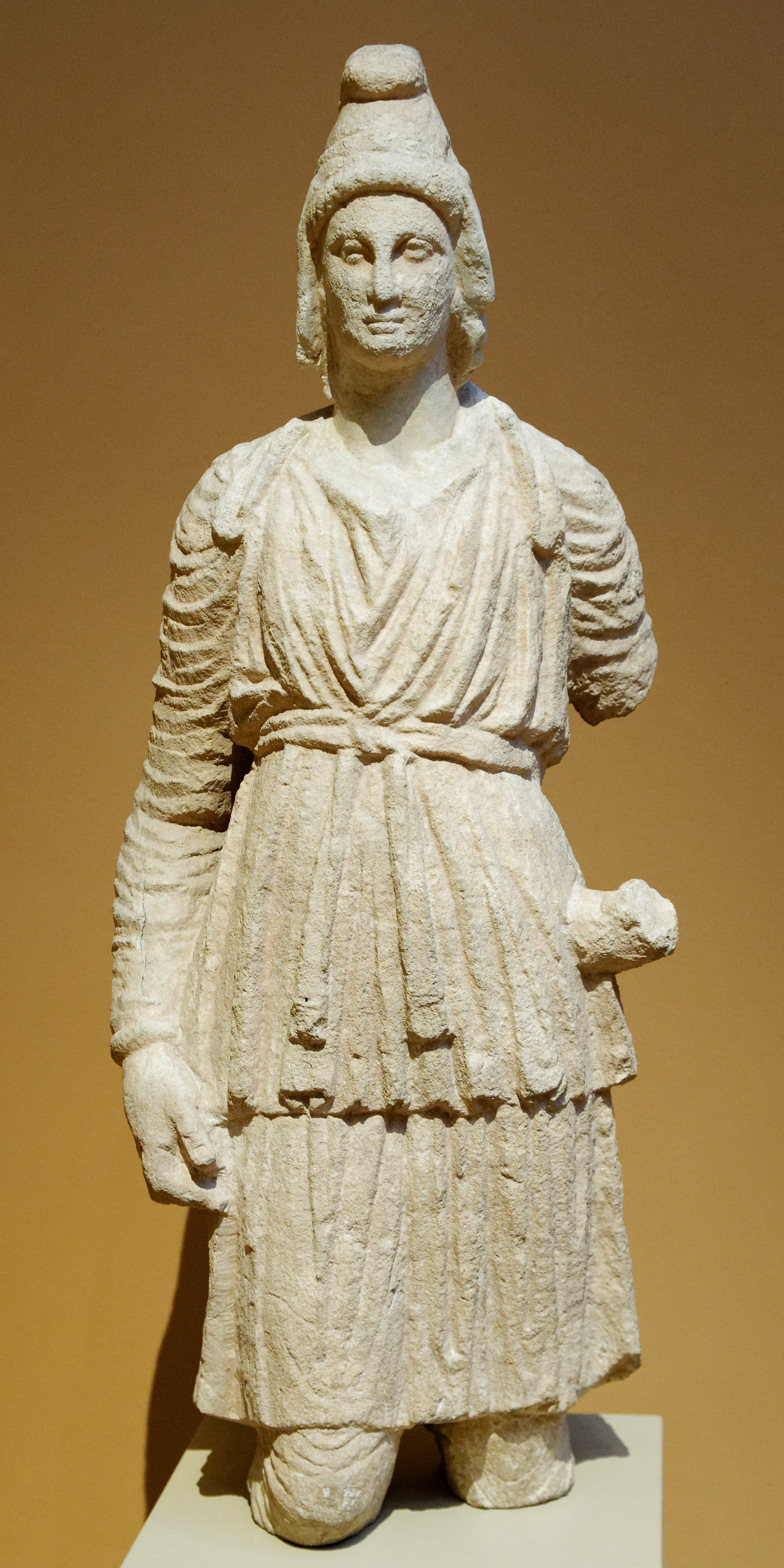
Hellenistic statue of the Thracian goddess Bendis

The Thracian goddess Bendis (Βένδις) was the Great Mother of Gods, similar to the Phrygian goddess Kubeleya, and was a mistress of animals who was associated to wild animals, as well as a power-giver connected to the Thracian elite, thus being a fertility deity and a potnia thērōn.

Bendis was identified with the Greek goddess Artemis, whom Herodotus of Halicarnassus described as one of the four main deities worshipped by the Thracians. According to Herodotus, Thracian and Paeonian women offered sacrifices to Artemis Basileia (lit. 'Artemis the Queen'). The cult of Bendis in Thrace was performed in open-air rock sanctuaries.

Bendis as identified with the Greek Artemis Phōsphoros was the main deity of the city of Kabyle, where was located a Phōsphorion (lit. 'temple of Phōsphoros'), and where she enjoyed a cult along with the Thracian "Apollo." The civic coins of Kabyle depicted Phōsphoros as wearing a long-belted gown and holding a torch in each hand, and this same image was crudely carved at the peak of Zayči Vruh, that is the acropolis of the city. Phōsphoros is also attested in an inscription from the city of Helis, which was the capital of the Getic king Dromichaetes.

Bendis is depicted on several Thracian gold and silver objects and on paintings in aristocratic Thracian tombs, implying that she was a protector of dynasts and aristocrats similar to the Phrygian Kubeleya; in the Sveshtari tomb, Bendis is depicted standing on a pedestal while she reaches out to an approaching horseman with a crown in her hand.

The public cult of Bendis was introduced to Athens in 430/429 BCE, with the Thracians being the only people to whom Athens granted the right to acquire land and build a sanctuary, the Bendideion in Piraeus.

Bendis was often depicted in the Hellenistic period using the same imagery as Artemis, but wearing a Phrygian cap. Roman-era votive tablets depicting a goddess riding a doe and holding a bow might also have represented Bendis.

Bendis was also depicted using the iconography similar to the Phrygian goddess Kubeleya, and she often appeared on the votive reliefs of the Thracian Horseman, where she was represented as a standing feminine figure with a hand raised in a gesture of benediction or salutation.

==== The Thracian "Dionysos" ====
One of the main Thracian gods, who was associated with an important Thracian solar cult, was identified with both the Greek Dionysos and Apollo, as attested by Alexander Polyhistor's account that the Thracians worshipped both "Sol" and "Liber" as one single god. Consequently, Apollo and Dionysos were popular gods in Hellenistic Thrace.

This god appears to have had aspects in common with the Greek god Dionysos, hence why he was assimilated with this latter deity. In his identification as the "Thracian Dionysos," this god had a widespread cult in Thrace, where he was the most popular deity, and his cult was particularly popular among the elite, due to which Dionysian themes were prominent among early tribal and royal coins in Thrace.

This god when identified with Apollo was meanwhile very popular in the region to the south of the Haemus range, with an altar dedicated to him being located in the agora of the city of Kabyle.

The cult of the Thracian "Dionysos" was mentioned twice by Herodotus of Halicarnassus, and he possessed a sanctuary in the Rhodope Mountains where one of his priestesses made prophecies, as well as a sanctuary with an altar in the city of Seuthopolis.

The Thracian "Dionysos" was a guarantor of oaths, as attested by him being invoked in a regulation by a mid-4th century BCE Thracian king which confirmed the rights of emporitai in Pistiros. Coins of the king Ketriporis were decorated with images of Dionysos wearing an ivy wreath.

A jug from the Rogozen treasure had an inscription reading Κοτυς Απολλωνος παις (Kotus Apollōnos pais), which described the Odrysian king Kotys I as a child or slave of the Thracian "Apollo."

The Thracian "Apollo" had several epithets, including Karsēnos, Paktyenos, and Kitharedes.

==== The Thracian Horseman ====
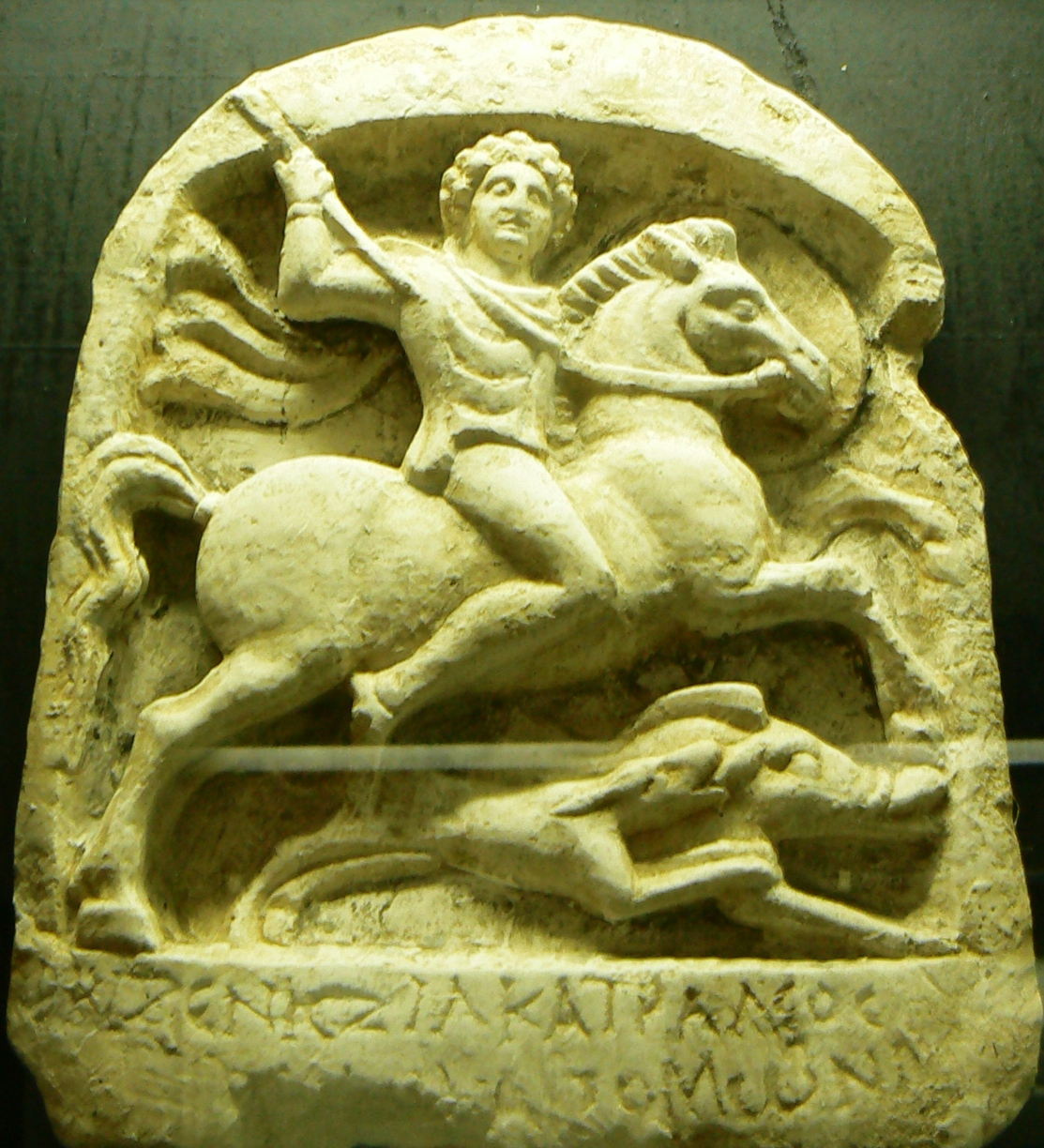
Hellenistic relief depicting the Thracian Horseman as a hunter

In eastern Thrace, the deity known as the Thracian Horseman or the Thracian Rider was worshipped in syncretism with the Greek Apollo; however, while the Rider was given epithets of the Greek Apollo, his image was not traditionally associated with the Greek Apollo, attesting that the cult of the Rider was significantly different from the cults of Apollo in Greece or Italy, and that the cults of the Rider and of the Greek Apollo were therefore not merely different forms of the same one cult.

Reliefs of the Rider were placed in both urban and rural sanctuaries in central Thrace, Philippopolis, and the regions surrounding the Greek colonies on the Black Sea shores of Thrace, where the cult of the Thracian "Apollo" was present.

In western Thrace, the Thracian Horseman was syncretised with Asclepius, and less often with Silvanus or Hephaestus in Moesia.

In the 5th century BCE, the king Sparadokos marked his coins with imagery associated with the Rider:

- the obverse of tetradrachmas featured a horseman;
- the obverse of drachmas featured a horse;
- the obverse of diobols featured a horse protome.

The obverse of Seuthes II's coins in the 4th century BCE also depicted the Rider on the obverse.

The position of this imagery was part of religious ideology, since the obverse of coins was reserved for divine depictions, and the image of the Rider might therefore have represented a royal ancestor. By the 4th century BCE, the depictions of the Rider were moved to the reverse of the coins, while the obverses were decorated with representations of other deities.

The Rider appeared with a reduced status on the coins of Kotys I and of Hellenistic Odrysian kings like Seuthes III, Skostokos and Rhoigos.

The presence of the Rider's image as decoration on coins, signet rings, tableware, weapons, horse trappings, and drawings in tombs, implies that he was regarded as an ancestor of the Thracian aristocracy, as well as its divine protector and its anthrōpodaimōn (deified man), being thus related to the status and ideology of Thracian kingship.

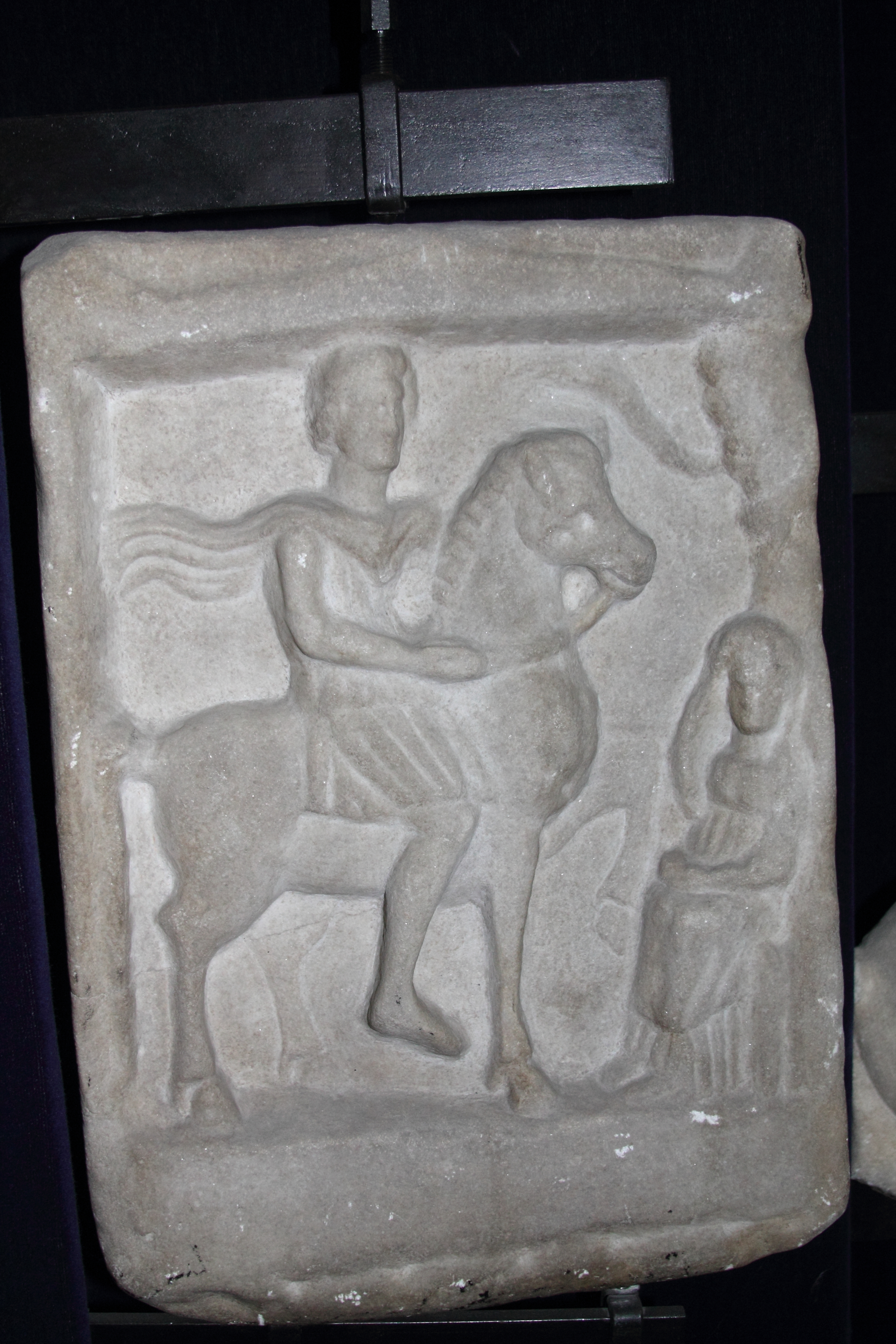
Stele of the Thracian Horseman standing in front of a Goddess who is seated under a tree

By the Hellenistic period, however, the image of the Thracian Horseman disappeared from luxuries and instead became more widely used, figuring on votive stone reliefs in sacred spaces, among which were anepigraphic dedications from ordinary Thracians; this more common use of the Rider's imagery became widespread through the Thracian provinces of the Roman Empire somewhat like a "national" cult, and the Rider was given an identity of hero (hērōs), god (theos), both hero and god (theos hērōs), or even a master (kyrios), who had several local epithets:

- Kendrisos (Κενδρισός) from Philippopolis,
- Karabasmos (Καράβασμος) from Odessos,
- Sandenos at the shrine of Glava Panega near Lovech,
- Propylaios (Προπυλαίος; guardian of the gate),
- Pyrmeroulas (of the cultivation of wheat),
- Aularkenos (guardian of the house),
- Perko,
- Karsenos,
- Mursine,
- and Manimadzos.

This image of the Thracian Horseman had become one of a deified ancestor who could however be identified with various Greek gods through inscriptions, and the iconography of the votive monuments depicting it used motifs from Hellenistic heroic cults and monuments where trees marked the burial place as sacred, a serpent acted as its guardian, and a raised altar suggested a ritual to fulfil the hero's manifestation as a horseman. Three types of such imagery are attested:

- the scene where the Rider stands in front of a goddess or goddesses, or an altar, or a tree with a snake, being a solemn scene of the hero's epiphany,
- the scene where the Rider is a hunter,
- the scene where the Rider returns from hunting, which represents the bliss of the hero in the afterlife.

By the Roman period, two types of monuments to the Thracian Horseman could be distinguished: votive ones and funerary ones. Of the 300 known monuments to the Thracian Horseman, most of them date from the Roman period.

==== Kotytto ====
According to Aeschylus, the Thracian goddess Kotyttō (Κοτυττώ) was worshipped by the Edonians.

In Aeschylus's drama, Ēdōnoi, the goddess Kottyto appears on stage anthropomorphically as a loose harp-player worshipped by effeminate men.

==== The Thracian "Hera" ====
According to Polyaenus, the king Cosingas of the Cebrenii and Sycaeboae was a priest of a goddess whom he identified with the Greek goddess Hera. When his people refused to obey him, Cosingas assembled a large number of ladders to ascend to Heaven to complain about them to the goddess.

==== The Ancestral Goddess ====
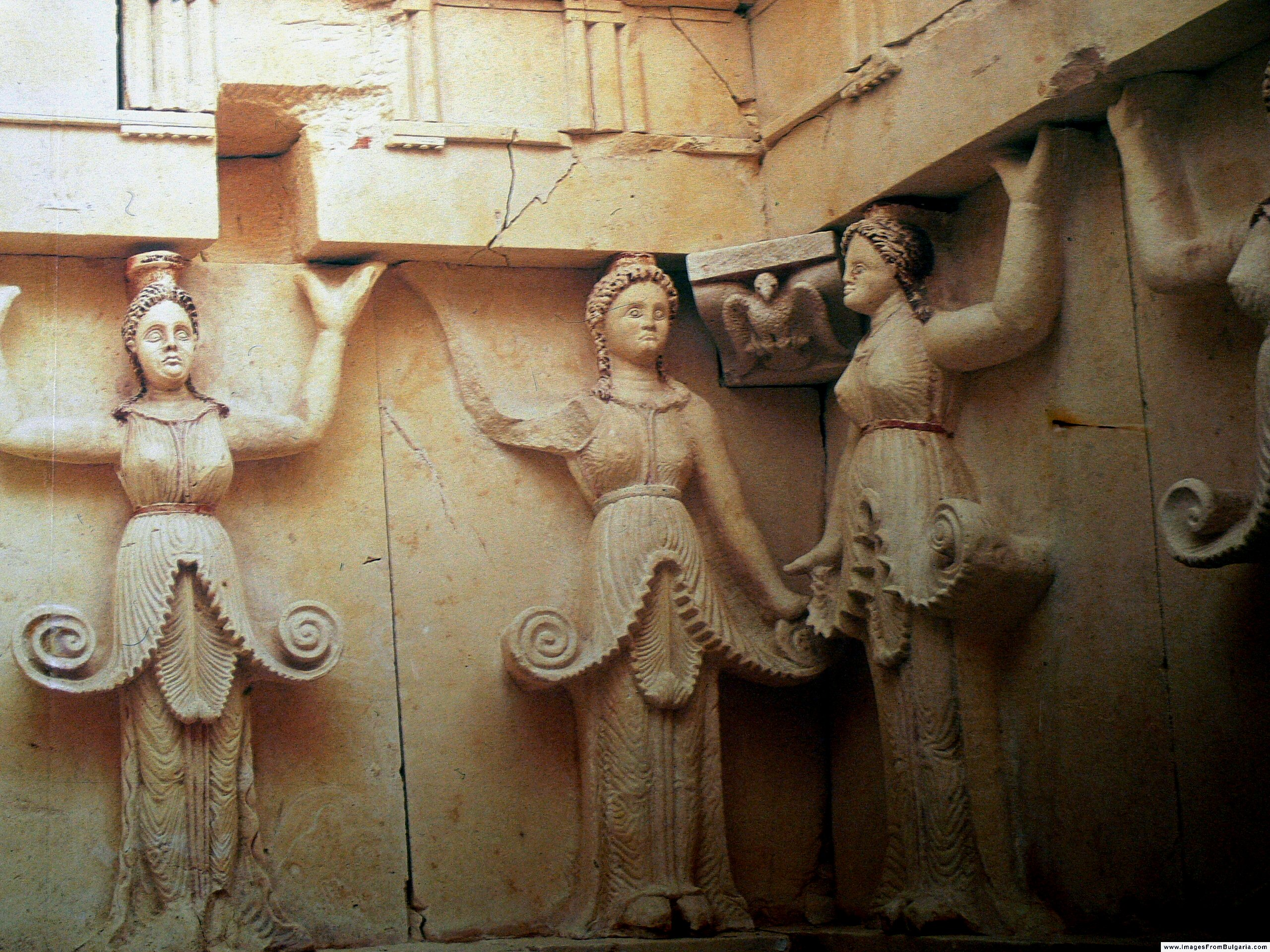
The semi-vegetal caryatids of the tomb of Sveshtari, representing the Ancestral Goddess

The Thracian pantheon possessed an equivalent of the Scythian Snake-Legged Goddess. This figure was depicted in the form of caryatids wearing kalathoi headdresses as well as chitons whose apoptygmai were shaped as floral volutes with an acanthus leaf between them, while their hands were disproportionately large similarly to the image of a fertility goddess with her hands raised to her face from a series of Thracian votive plaques.

A representation of this goddess might be found in a greave from Vratsa, whose knee is shaped like a woman's head wearing an ivy wreath and having parallel gold stripes on her right cheek, while her body is covered with snakes, including lion-headed ones, as well as lions, and a dove. This iconography, as well as the goddess's divided face, show her dual nature.

A representation of the cult of this goddess, who was also a potnia thērōn, is depicted on a gilt silver greave from Zlatinitsa, where a rider holding a rhyton with a stag protome is depicted above a lady sitting on a throne and holding a spindle while drinking from a cup.

This goddess is depicted on a plaque from the Letnitsa treasure as engaging in sexual intercourse with the Thracian "Dionysos" so as to engender humanity, similarly to how the Snake-Legged Goddess copulated with "Hēraklēs" to engender humanity in the Scythian genealogical myth. The various aspects of this goddess, including her union with the Thracian ancestor-hero to become the ancestress of humanity, suggests that she and the Scythian Snake-Legged goddess have similar origins.

==== Derzalas or Darzalas ====
A god referred to with the Thracian name Derzalas or Darzalas in the Roman period has been attested in Odessos since the Hellenistic period, when he was called only by the epithet of Theos Megas (Θεος Μεγας), that is the Great God. Derzalas was the patron god of Odessos, and, although this god likely had ancient origins, he is not attested before the 4th century BCE.

Derzalas was depicted on silver tetradrachms from Odessos dating from the 2nd century BCE, where he appeared as a bearded god with a ribbon in his hair on the obverse, and as turned to the left while wearing a long chiton and holding a patera in his right hand and a cornucopia in his left hand.

A monument to Derzalas existed between Nicopolis and Marcianopolis in Moesia Inferior, where a marble plaque depicts him as a bearded god wearing a long chiton, and holding a patera over a burning altar in his right hand and a cornucopia in his left hand. One relief with the Thracian Horseman included a dedicatory inscription to the god Derzis, that is Derzalas. And another relief from this same area depicted a bearded Thracian Horseman whose horse charged against an altar while his dog chased a boar.

On coins of Odessos, Derzalas was depicted as lying on a klinē, which was a position typical of the iconographies of chthonic deities. Meanwhile, his cornucopia signalled him as a giver of fertility.

The various depictions of Derzalas all suggest that he was a chthonic deity.

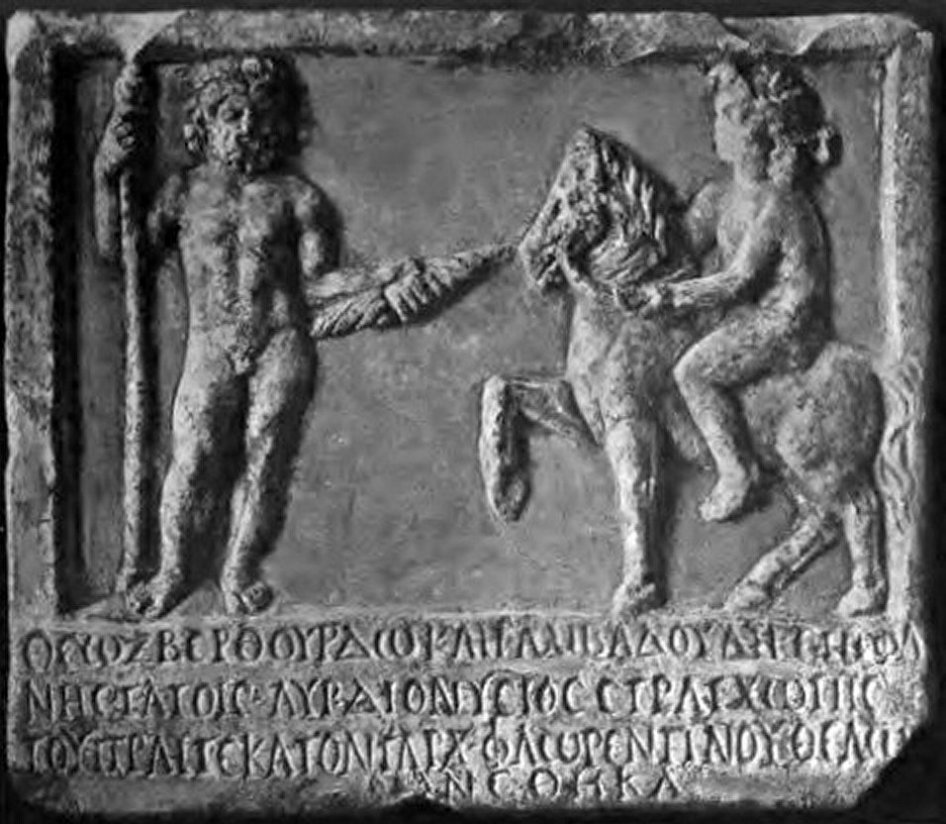
Dedication to Zbelthiurdos (Svelsurdus) and Iambadoule.

==== Svelsurdus ====
During the Roman period, Cicero mentioned a sanctuary of Jupiter Svelsurdus in the territory of the Dentheletae in the Strymon valley. This deity is known from several Roman-era dedications in the territories inhabited by Thracians.

The Thracian epithet of Svelsurdus suggests that this was a native Thracian deity who had been assimilated with the Greek Zeus, and he was depicted using the iconography of Zeus Keraunios who holds a thunderbolt, is accompanied by an eagle, and has a snake at his legs.

==== Pleistoros ====
The god Pleistoros was worshipped by the Apsinthii, who propitiated him with human sacrifices.

==== Kandaon ====
The god Kandaon was worshipped by the Krestones.

==== Zalmoxis ====
The god Zalmoxis or Salmoxis was worshipped by the Getae, possibly in the form of an anthrōpodaimōn (deified man).

According to Herodotus of Halicarnassus, Zalmoxis built a hall where he feasted and preached to the most prominent of his countrymen that he, as well as them and their descendants, would not die, but would instead go to a place where they would enjoy immortality and every good thing. Zalmoxis then built an underground chamber into which disappeared for three years, during which time the Thracians mourned him, after which he reappeared on the fourth year, proving his words to be true and convincing his people of his story of death and resurrection.

A similar Thracian figure is Rhesus, who, like Zalmoxis, was a divine king and prophet whose declared that he would not go into the underworld but would instead remain "in the caverns of silver-veined land" of Mount Pangaion where he would become an anthrōpodaimōn, the difference being that Rhesus was a tribal deity of the Edonians while Zalmoxis was that of the Getae.

During the 5th century BCE, Greek colonists in Thrace had come to connect Zalmoxis to the Greek philosopher Pythagoras due to his prophetic abilities, magical healing, and other extraordinary traits; the similarities between the feasts of Getic nobles in their banqueting halls with the Pythagorean adepts' meetings and meals in a common halls, and their respective initiation rides, appear to have also motivated the connection between Zalmoxis and Pythagoras among the Pontic Greeks.

These anthrōpodaimones were believed to be mediators between the gods and men.

==== Other deities ====
During the 4th century BCE, the coins of the king Hebryzelmis were decorated images of the goddess Cybele wearing a mural crown on the obverse, those of Kersobleptes were decorated with images of the goddess Demeter.

During the Hellenistic period, new deities appeared in Thrace due to Greek influence: the coins of the king Seuthes III depicted a head of the Greek god Zeus on the obverse, and a Macedonian-influenced portrait of Seuthes III himself on the reverse.

The king Mostis depicted Zeus on his coins, Adaios's coins bore the image of Athena on them, the coin of Kotys II had images of Artemis, and the coins of Skostokos, Adaios and Mostis all were decorated with images of Apollo.

A temple of Apollo is referred to in an honorary decree enacted by politai possibly from Philippopolis, and a treaty between two ruling families mentioned a Phosphorion, an altar of Apollo on the agora of Kabyle, and a temple of the Samothracian gods and an altar of Dionysos on the agora of Seuthopolis.

A hero named Melsas was worshipped at Mesembria.

A temple to a group of deities originating from Samothrace, called the Kabeiroi but also known as the Theoi Megaloi (Θεοί Μεγάλοι), meaning lit. 'Great Gods', was located in the city of Seuthopolis, with the worship of these deities being the city's main cult along with that of the Thracian "Dionysos."

The ruler Spartokos of Kabyle depicted the deities Artemis Phōsphoros and Heracles; these two deities, together with Apollo and Athena, later appeared on the municipal coins of Kabyle. After Kabyle underwent its municipal transformation, Artemis became its goddess and her cult statue became the emblem of the city and replaced the ruler's image.

=== Mythology ===
The Thracian religion appeared to have possessed a myth of the union between an ancestor-god and an ancestress-goddess similar to that of the Scythian genealogical myth. This divine union might have been depicted in the hierogamy scene from the Letnitsa treasure.

== Customs ==
=== Abstention from killing ===
Demosthenes claimed that it was customary among Thracians to not kill each other.

=== Divination ===
An oracular sanctuary of the Thracian "Dionysos" was located in the territory of the Satrae tribe in the Rhodope Mountains, where members of the tribe of the Bessoi served in it and a priestess made prophecies similarly to the oracle of Delphi.

This might be the same sanctuary referred to by Roman sources as the sacred grove of "Liber" in Thrace, where the priests predicted to Alexander III of Macedon that he would conquer the world, which they saw in the high fire that flared on its altar after the wine libation, and which the priests again later predicted to Gaius Octavius when he consulted this oracle regarding his son's future.

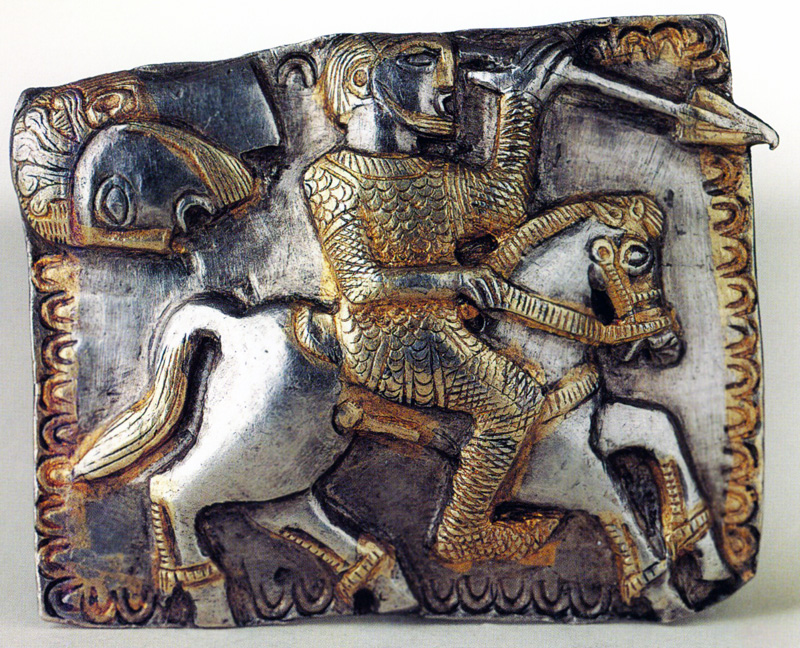
Thracian plaque depicting a mounted spearman with a severed human head behind him.

=== Royal customs ===
Thracian kings were believed to be of divine origin, being descendants of the Thracian "Hermes," and their special status is attested by the presence of their portraits on the obverse of coins, which is where the images of protective deities usually appeared: the coins of Amatokos I and Saratokos in the late 5th century BCE, and later those of Hebryzelmis and Kotys I followed this custom.

This custom might have been a propagandistic expression of power similar to the coins of Achaemenid satraps, or may have referred to a ruler's cult as was commonly practised after the reign of Alexander III of Macedon. Whether this meant that the kings were held to be king-gods, with honours above that of royal dignity, is unclear.

=== Storm customs ===
According to Herodotus of Halicarnassus, the Thracians used to shoot arrows towards the sky during thunder and lightning as a threat to the god, since they only believed in Zalmoxis.

=== War customs ===
The Thracians used to carry the heads of the enemies they had killed in battle back to their homes, and some Thracian artifacts depicted severed men's and horses' heads behind horsemen.

=== Funerary customs ===
The afterlife was an important part of the Thracian religion, as reflected how Thracians built large and elaborate tombs and kurgans. Tombs of upper class Thracians contained chambers which were used for private family rituals.

==== Cremations ====
Most Iron Age Thracian burials were cremations.

==== Upper class inhumations ====
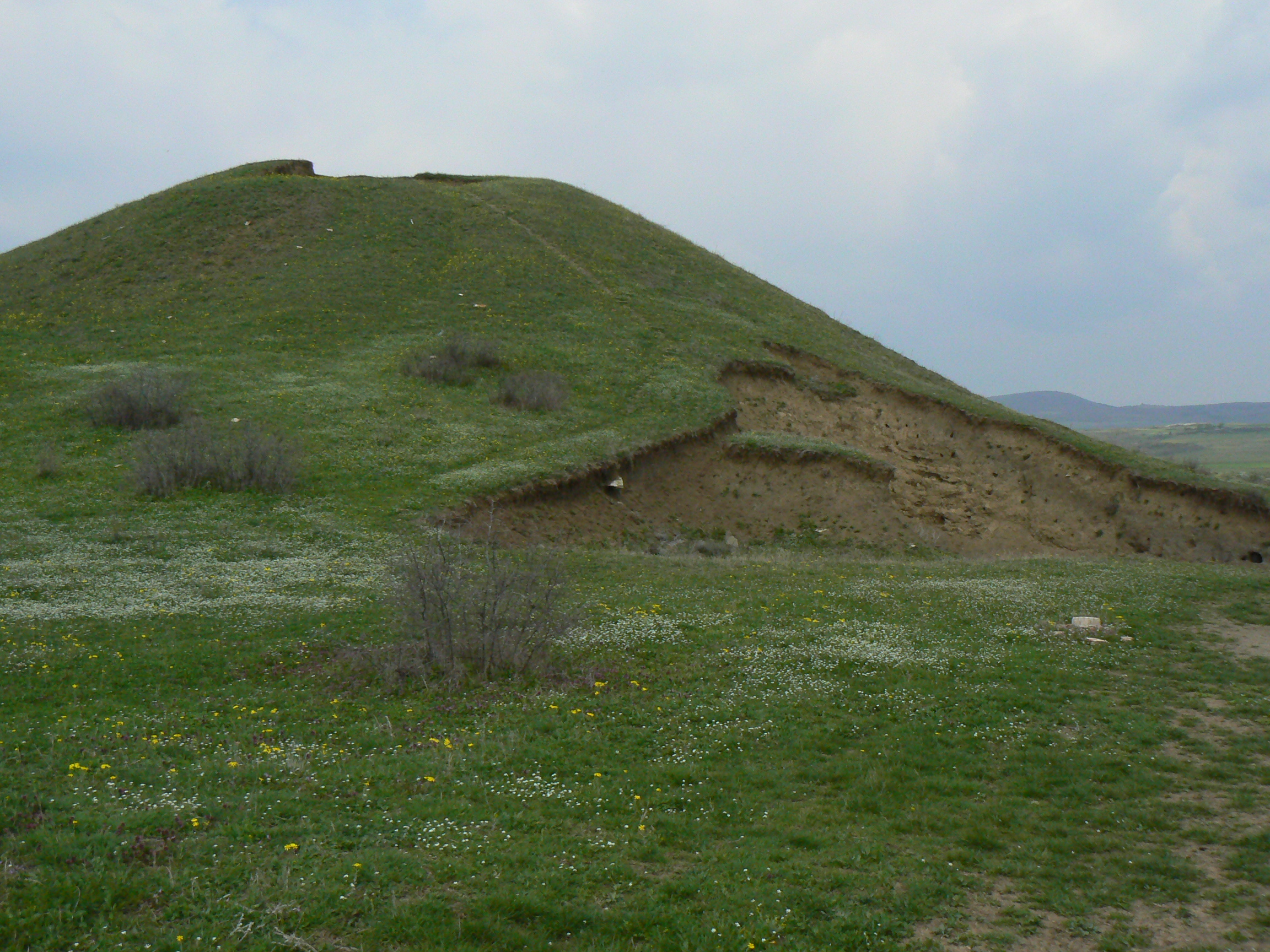
The Zlata Mogila, a Thracian burial mound.

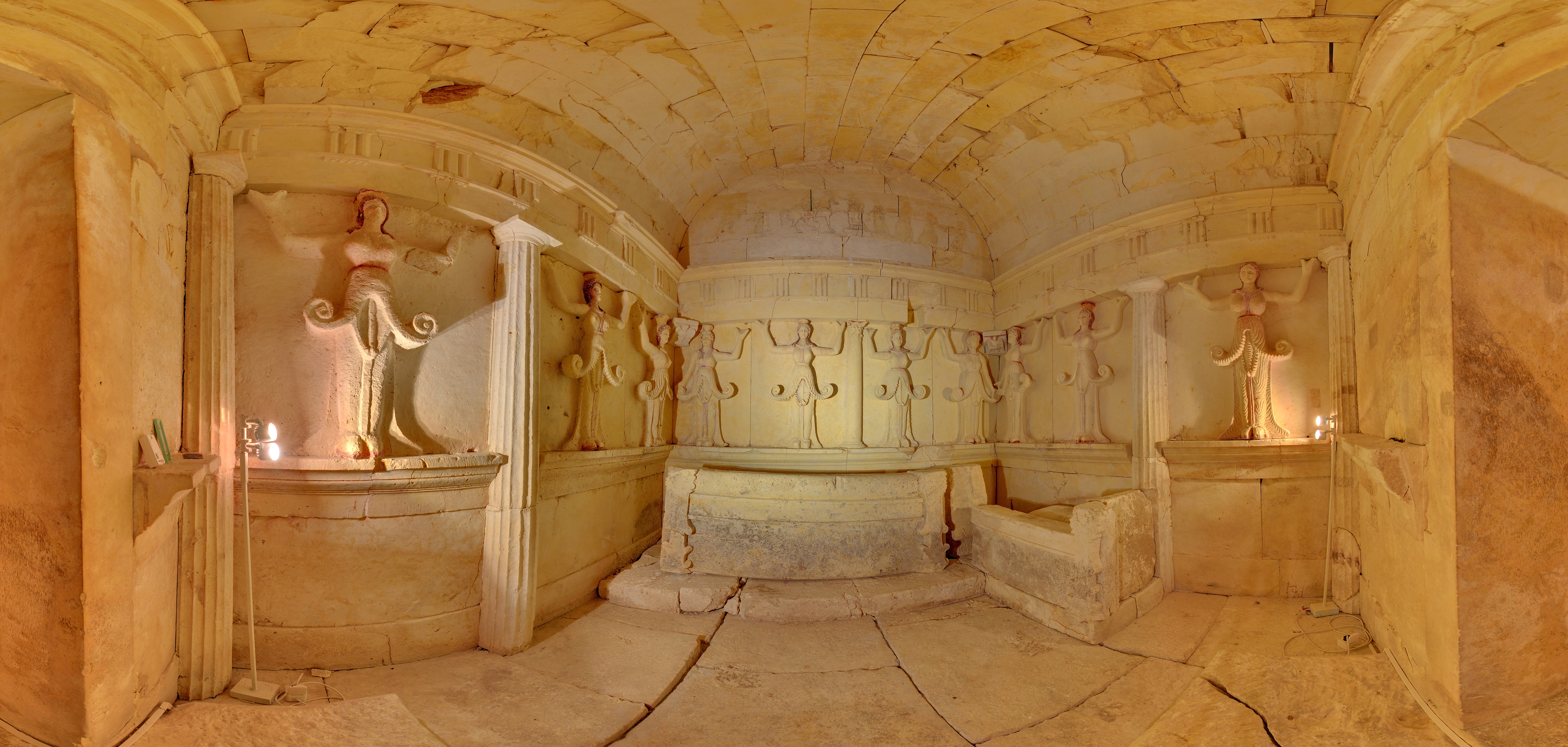
The interior of the Thracian tomb at Sveshtari.

Royal and aristocratic Thracian burials during the Hellenistic period consisted of inhumations, with their tombs possessing spaces to act as the dwellings of the deceased as well as to perform rituals to contact the said deceased. This practice was linked to the concept of the deceased elites achieving immortality and bliss on the periphery of the inhabited world, due to which they did not depend on the living.

Therefore, these upper class burials covered by mounds were built on the ground level or on reused embankments above it, as physical representations of the idea that those buries within them were not within the kingdom of the dead in the underworld, which was sometimes further accentuated by sumptuous stairs leading to the tombs within them.

Fitting the vision of the future the deceased elites would enjoy after death, these tombs were located far from settlements of the living, and within them the dead were laid on couches or beds which were not dug into the floor and tableware was present, so that they formed a banquet scene on the inside, thus being reminiscent of the afterlife promised by Zalmoxis to his followers.

The tombs' entrances could also function as exits, and allowed for communication between the world of the living and that of the deceased through an open area leading to the interior, which was itself inaccessible.

As a result of the shift from belief in immortality of body and soul towards one of the "heroisation" of the deceased during the Hellenistic period, burials from this era were personalised with visible inscriptions or portraits. This newer practice continued until the Roman period, when commoners started being buried in monumental burials as well.

==== Horse burials ====
Accompanying the deceased was often a horse, placed in the antechamber of the tombs or before their entrances: the horse was placed there to accompany its master in the afterlife, and was therefore treated in the same way as the deceased irrespective of whether they were inhumated or cremated.

==== Funerary rituals ====
Within the burial mounds were pits and hearths which were used by the living to communicate with the deceased. These were especially performed at the tombs' entrances before they were completely covered under the mounts, and were similar to Greek cults performed on altars at the front doors of Greek temples and homes for deities and heroes. The Thracian rituals were likely "rites of passage" meant to help the deceased achieve the status of anthrōpodaimones.

===== Mounds =====
Mounds formed from offerings are documented among Thracian ritual practices. These were associated with offering pits or other sacrificial deposits.

== The afterlife ==
The Thracian vision of the afterlife considered that a state of blissful immortality after death could be achieved through both the soul and the body, as is attested in Plato's account that Zalmoxis taught the Thracian physicians to heal both soul and body because these were one and the same. Herodotus of Halicarnassus had recorded that the Thracians were not afraid of death, which is consistent with the positive attitude towards dying that people who have experienced various mystical states have.

Thus, Herodotus claimed that the Getae were the most brave and lawful of Thracians who apathanatizein (ἀπαθανατίζειν), that is they "made themselves immortal," because they believed they would not die but would instead go to Zalmoxis: immortality was a recurring theme of Thracian kingship, and within Thracian religion, aristocrats were believed to go to a place where they would not die, but would achieve immortality and live in perpetual bliss; commoners could however only reach this state by dying bravely in battle, or by being sacrificed as a messenger to the god Zalmoxis, with those who met this fate being believed to gone to Zalmoxis himself without dying.

The Thracian concept of the elite's immortality itself resulted from state formation which occurred in the 6th century BCE and lasted until the Roman annexation of Thrace: the Thracian aristocracy believed that it would obtain immortality where it would enjoy bliss not unlike its lifestyle in the world of the living, which would be achieved in places on the periphery of the inhabited world after being transferred there by the gods.

The Thracian idea of immortality in both body and spirit was similar to Pindar's conception of Heracles as a "hero-god," which might in turn explain Porphyry's claim that Barbarians like Heracles worshipped Zalmoxis. Similar elements were also present in the Greek religion, such as:

- Homer's account of Menelaus being brought to the Elysian Fields without dying,
- Hesiod's account of the race of heroes being sent to the Islands of the Blessed without dying,
- Bacchylides's account of Apollo saving Croesus from his funeral pyre and bringing him to Hyperborea,
- the myth of Achilles's mother taking his body from his pyre and bringing him to the White Island in the Pontus Euxinus.

Thus, the Thracian afterlife was different from the Greek notion of heroisation where the deceased's human nature was preserved and reinforced with divinity, but instead viewed the transition after life as one not requiring passing through death as promised by Zalmoxis.

This conceptualisation of the Thracian afterlife is recorded in the Greek story of the Thracian king Rhesus who remained as an anthrōpodaimōn in a cavern of the silver-veined Mount Pangaion instead of descending to the underworld to become a shadow there: like Zalmoxis, Rhesus obtained immortality without dying.

Like among the Greeks, during the Hellenistic period the Thracian concept of immortality of body and soul was transformed into one of "heroisation" of the dead and of their immortal souls as a result of the replacement of the older epic traditions by newer literary ones. Thus, funerary reliefs depicting the Thracian Horseman often identified the deceased as "immortal heroes" since mortals after death became divine ancestors or were deified. However the native Thracian notion of immortality after life remained current among the northern Thracian tribes such as the Getae until the Roman conquest.

The practice of posthumous heroisation is visible in Thracian culture: the wall painting of the tomb of Sveshtari represents a feminine figure who might be a goddess crowning with a wreath a horseman who has horns, which is a Hellenistic artistic convention for showing his divine status.

== Cult ==
Scarce information about Thracian rituals and the Thracian calendar have been preserved.

The Thracians communicated with their deities through rituals which were performed in human living space:

- the domestic cult was performed within the house;
- the communal cult was performed in sanctuaries.

Since the Thracians were composed of several distinct tribes living across a large territory, there were likely regional variations among the rituals they practised.

=== Hearth altars ===
A type of Thracian altar consisted of a circular clay structure which had been used since the Bronze Age. These later gave rise to decorated square altars during the Iron Age.

A widespread feature of Thracian cultic sites was the presence of square hearths made of hard clay which had often been fired to a greyish white colour, and were decorated with inscribed geometric patterns as well as impressed and stamped: the designs decorating them included florals, vegetal bands containing ivy leaves and snakes. These hearths were low platforms which were raised some centimetres above the floor surrounding it, being therefore similar to Greek altars to chthonic deities.

These hearth altars were present especially in urban locations such as at Seuthopolis, Philippopolis, Kabyle, Pistiros, and Helis, and could be found both in sanctuaries and in the residences of individuals; at Seuthopolis, they were located in a representative room separate from the oikos where the hearth was located. The hearth altars were not domestic hearths, but were instead most likely used as part of purification rituals to burn, not food, but hallucinogens or aromatic substances such as incense: Thracians would throw seeds into the fire while seated around them in banquets, and the smoke would induce a state similar to drunkenness, which allowed communication with the deities through enthusiasm or ecstasy.

Associated with these hearths were andirons made of stone and clay and decorated with pairs protomes of horses or rams on both sides of the fire. These were present in burial places as well as domestic spaces in villages outside of the cities and towns, in a similar range of environments as the hearths. The horses decorating them likely represented the popular belief of a solar chariot with celestial fire possessing purifying power.

=== Sanctuaries ===
Only few Thracian sanctuaries are attested before the Roman conquest of Thrace, with most having started being used from c. 175 to c. 250 CE and ending their operations until the ban on paganism in the Roman Empire by the emperor Theodosius I in the late 4th century CE.

Thracian sanctuaries consisted of:

- intramural sanctuaries located within settlements,
- and extramural sanctuaries located outside settlements, which were themselves composed of mountains and lowland areas.

Among these sanctuaries, some were used only by local worshippers, while others were used by devotees from large areas: rural communities had access to small shrines present near their villages, and they used larger and more distant shrines as important cult centres, while they could access the further distant mountain shrines only during festivities.

Thracian sanctuaries had different plans and layouts compared to Greek ones, and were used as treasuries, but did not possess monumental altars. Their buildings were simple, and except for the temple in antis near Pernik and a tetraprostyle near Kopilovtsi, they did not resemble Greek temple buildings; Thracian sanctuaries also lacked structures such as theatres, stadiums, hospitals or facilities for pilgrims, suggesting that they were used only by rural populations living near them.

==== Extramural sanctuaries ====
Traditionally Thracian sanctuaries were found far from daily life activities. The identities of the deities worshipped at these sanctuaries have so far been difficult to ascertain.

===== Highland sanctuaries =====
The several mountain-related goddess epithets in Thrace suggest that mountains and rocky highlands were considered as sacred among the Thracians. Mountain sanctuaries were especially found on sunlit peaks in the wild: these include rock sanctuaries, which are characterised by cuttings on exposed bedrock which were used as chutes, pools, niches, steps and altars, such as those at Babyak, Tatul and Perperek.

The oracle of "Dionysos" located on the Zelmisos hill, in the mountains of the tribe of the Satrae and where the Bessi served as the priests while a priestess pronounced oracles, within a circular Thracian sanctuary.

===== Lowland sanctuaries =====
Lowland sanctuaries were located near or even within settlements, such as at Levunovo, Nebet Tepe and Kabyle, or sometimes on elevations within lowland areas. These consisted of a holy precinct enclosed by a peribolos. The temenos at Babyak had a separation of activities whereby different areas were specifically used for offering gifts and for burning sacrifices on clay altars and hearths.

The sanctuaries in the plains were close to human settlements and were likely located in agricultural lands. These sanctuaries were not recorded by Greek authors or by epigraphic sources, and are therefore only known from archaeological evidence. Some of these sanctuaries, such as the one at Bagachina, had been used from the Early Bronze Age until the Roman period, although most of them had started being used in the 4th century BCE.

The native Thracian sanctuaries within Moesia were located far from towns or Roman camps, and were largely found in the foothills of the Balkan Mountain and in the less Romanised eastern part of the province. In Thracia, the sanctuaries in the plains were set on high ground so they could be more visible in this region, and were marked by natural rocks, springs and rivers.

Sanctuaries were also dedicated to divine ancestors of the aristocracy, to deified mortals in monumental tombs that functioned as tombs, homes and shrine, as well as heroised mortals who were seen as local heroes of rural communities.

==== Intramural sanctuaries ====
Sanctuaries and shrines located within settlements are primarily known from Hellenistic Thrace, and the existence of temples and shrines within towns and cities under strong Greek influence suggest that they were influenced by Greek religious cults.

With the building of new towns in the beginning of the Hellenistic age, temples and altars were inaugurated, including those of Artemis Phōsphoros and Apollo in Kabyle and of the Great Gods and Dionysos in Seuthopolis, with these temples possessing local priests and acting as repositories of the city archives.

==== Known Thracian sanctuaries ====
===== Zilmissos =====
According to Macrobius, a Thracian temple was located at the top of the hill of Zilmissos: this was round and temple had an opening in the middle of the roof, and the sun was identified with "Liber" under the name of "Sebazius" there.

===== Thasos =====
A sanctuary of "Hēraklēs" was located on the island of Thasos, and consisted of:

- an earlier temple;
- and a hearth-sanctuary:
  - unlike Classical Greek sanctuaries to the Olympian gods, the sanctuary consisted of a long building whose plan resembled a Greek temple, with a short porch and a long cella;
  - the sanctuary of Thasos was focused on cultic activities which took place within it, unlike Greek sanctuaries which were centred on an open air altar;
  - a square hearth outlined with stone blocks was located at the centre of the cella, which was itself supported by two axial pillars on either side of it.

The Thasian sanctuary's unusual structure in comparison to Greek sanctuaries appeared to have represented a Thracian ritual tradition.

===== At Seuthopolis =====
As a result of an agreement between the Thracian king Seuthes III and the Macedonian king Lysimachus, the cult of the Kabeiroi was imported into the Hellenistic Thracian city of Seuthopolis. A sanctuary of the Kabeiroi, called the Samothrakeion, was located in the fortified section of Seuthopolis:

- this sanctuary was built of unbaked bricks over a stone foundations, and its roof was decorated with marble akroteria and clay antefixes;
- the main chamber of the sanctuary was large and spacious and its walls were decorated with plaster which had been painted red:
  - this chamber contained the largest clay hearth discovered in Thrace as well as an inscription;
- the sanctuary possessed a complex of three sets of rooms alongside the main chamber which opened axially onto a portico located at the long side of the temple, and from there onto a courtyard:
  - the room adjacent to the main chamber also contained a hearth similar to the principal one;
  - these rooms were not structured to connect with each other, which thus resembled the Thasian sanctuary;
- the temple was itself located in a large yard which was fully surrounded by turreted walls, with a propylon separating the yard from the rest of the city.

The sanctuary of Seuthopolis had aspects of its layout which were similar to the sanctuary of Thasos, and its plan was unlike domestic or residential buildings from the rest of the city.

A structure tentatively identified with an altar and temple of the Thracian "Dionysos" has been discovered in the agora of Seuthopolis:

- the structure was enclosed in an almost rectangular open space whose eastern boundary was formed by the city's main arterial road, and whose southern limit was the main east–west road, which ran from the south-west to the north-east;
- within this enclosure were located large ashlar blocks which resembled a Classical Greek altar, and which have been interpreted as having formed part of the altar of the Thracian "Dionysos";
- the foundations of the temple were however too badly damaged to allow for any reconstruction of its structure.

===== In Athens =====
A sanctuary of the goddess Bendis was located on the Munychia Hill of Piraeus in Athens.

===== At Kabyle =====
After Kabyle had been conquered by the king Philip II of Macedon, he installed a garrison and settled Macedonian Greek inhabitants there, hence why there were Greek cults present in this city: according to an inscription from Seuthopolis, a Phosphorion was located in Kabyle and a bōmos of Apollo was found in its agora.

Hearth altars have been found at Kabyle, on the low hill of Hissarlik which was located opposite of Zayči Vruh.

Nonetheless, water channels and niches connected to cultic practice had been cut on Zayči Vruh before Philip II built a military tower there, and a crude image of the goddess Phōsphoros wearing a long gown and holding torches in each of her hands was carved there.

===== On Samothrace =====
Some buildings with unusual building plans on Samothrace also represented a Thracian ritual tradition, such as:

- a hieron whose designed emphasised activities within it, and had a hearth altar as well as walls painted in red
- an anaktoron from the early Roman Empire with a similar plan as the Thasian sanctuary which was divided into a main chamber with a wooden platform, a restricted inner chamber, and a hearth altar within a walled precinct.

===== At Philippopolis =====
A complete hearth altar was found in an open area in the fortified eastern gateway of the city's acropolis on Nebet Tepe, and another one was founded in the city area close below Nebet Tepe.

===== At Kallatis =====
A rock-cut sanctuary at Kallatis might have begun as a native Thracian shrine until it later came to be used by Greek colonists as well.

===== At Batkun =====
An inscription from Batkun mentioned a sanctuary of Apollo where the citizens had dedicated a stele in honour of a prominent individual. These citizens were themselves from Philippopolis or Pistiros, suggesting that this was a Greek cult.

===== At Sboryanovo =====
A sanctuary from Sboryanovo in northeastern Thrace dating from between c. 450 BCE to the early 3rd century BCE consisted of a quadrangular clay building standing on a beaten earth floor which had a wooden roof and a cornice decorated with terracotta with the same rope-impressed patterns used as ornamentation on the hearth altars.

This sanctuary contained two quadrangular platforms which were located on both sides of two successive circular raised altars, with one of them having a convex surface. These altars were rectilinear, were surrounded by a sill of rough stones, and had rounded corners. Their foundation, made of small stones mixed with earth, stood 20 centimetres above the clay floor surrounding them, was covered with clay and painted with a white layer.

The sanctuary of Sboryanovo was located immediately to the west of the river Krapinets. A shrine was located near a river source above the gorge there, and this shrine as well as a large area of ritual importance immediately below it were both enclosed in a stone wall in the 4th to 3rd centuries BCE. To its west, on the plateau, was another ritual site that had been enclosed in a stone wall in the 4th to 3rd century BCE, and where a dedication to "Phōsphoros" had been inscribed and shallow stone circles had been built in the Hellenistic period.

Two large mound cemeteries lined both sides of the gorge in parallel, and the eastern one of these contained monumental stone tombs which were used as cultic sites.

===== At Tsrancha =====
A rock sanctuary at Tsrancha contained a circular clay altar with a distinct border and an umbo-like central protrusion, as well as a clay plaque decorated in relief which was also likely used as an altar.

===== At Vetren =====
The site of Vetren contained a Thracian sanctuary which had been used over a significant period of time.

The altars at Vetren appear to have been built in several structures, and some might have been in the open air. Cereal grains, loom weights, spindle whorls and several figurine types were located near these alters, implying that they were used in cults relating to fertility and procreation.

Parts of altars have been found throughout the site of Vetren, meaning that these were regularly built in multiple locations, although several were located near two altars in a way suggesting that the fragments were earlier temporary sites of cultic activity which were used to make bases for later altars, and which became permanent cultic sites.

The fortifications located near the sanctuary area contained traces of ritual activity such as pits, altar fragments, mobile clay braziers, and figurines.

A complete altar and partial remains of two other altars were located at the western end of an excavated terrace located behind a courtyard complex, which itself contained altar fragments in one of its rooms.

Cultic activities were largely concentrated in two squares to the south of the settlement, where several superimposed altars and hearths dating from the 3rd to 2nd centuries BCE were located, as well as in two other squares located near the terrace, with one of these squares containing one altar. Another of the altars near this latter set of squares being surrounded by a fence on three sides. The altars in the other of this set of squares already had permanent altars in the 4th century BCE which had themselves been built over previous temporary ritual sites.

Thus, although there were specific parts of the Vertren settlement that were reserved for cultic activities, rituals were also performed in several places there, and the altars' use in both domestic and non-domestic settings well as both indoors and outdoors suggests that they were used to perform different rituals for various occasions or multiple deities.

=== Clergy ===
The Thracian religion possessed various priestly offices:

- at the lower level were priests who held the indispensable function of officiating the tribal cults,
- and of higher status were priests who likely inherited their prominent positions from ancient legendary priest-kings; examples of such kings include:
  - the king Cosingas of Cebrenii and the Sycaeboae, who was also their priest;
  - Zalmoxis of the Getae had been a priest before he had become a god himself;
  - Diegylis offered human sacrifices in 145 BCE;
  - one Vologaesus, who was priest of the Bessian sanctuary of the Thracian "Dionysos," led an anti-Roman revolt in 15 BCE;
  - at the time of Burebista, Decaeneus was the Dacian priest, and he also acted as sorcerer and the king's advisor before later becoming seen as divine;
  - the Odrysian king Kotys I was described as a son or slave of the Thracian "Apollo" in an inscription and he offered sacrifices to the gods at his feasts.
  - thus, the Thracians worshipped Zalmoxis, and the high priest of this god was also the king as well as his substitute on Earth.

Thracian priests held a high social status, ranking immediately below the king.

The Thracian priests were believed to have been given the power to heal by Zalmoxis himself, who taught them to heal the body and the soul together: these healing abilities of the priests of Zalmoxis are similar to those of medicine men and shamans who derived their powers from altered states of consciousness.

Decorations on some Thracian jugs also suggest that there existed Thracian priestesses who attended goddesses.

In the early 3rd century BCE, one Amaistas son of Medistas dedicated an altar once his term as priest of the Thracian "Dionysos" was complete, suggesting that the Thracian priesthood had a fixed term and could be held by other occupants in succession, similar to the priesthoods of Greek city-states.

According to an account by the Gothic historian Jordanes, when Philip II of Macedon attempted to besiege Odessos, Getae priests wearing white clothes and playing citharas to accompany the prayers to their gods opened the gates of the city and came out marching against the Macedonian soldiers and chanting pleas for help to their ancestral deities.

Heroised mortals who became seen after death as local heroes were invoked in prayers for help and protections through simple rituals which did not require the mediation of priests.

==== Vegetarianism ====
According to Strabo of Amasia, the Mysians did not consume living things, not even their flocks, out of piety for their belief in the transmigration of souls, but instead subsisted on honey, milk and cheese, and lived peacefully, due to which they were called theosebeis (θεοσεβεῖς), meaning "god fearing," and kapnobatai (καπνοβάται), meaning "cloud walkers" or "fire walkers." According to Strabo, the Getae also practised a vegetarian lifestyle.

The name of the kapnobatai has been sometimes interpreted as being derived from a practice of inhaling cannabis vapours similarly to Scythians, with their name meaning "those who walk in [hemp] smoke," or as referring to the practive of walking on embers, although this interpretation is very uncertain.

The kapnobatai might have been shamans, and a parallel to their name is found in Indic traditions in the form of the term dhūma-gati to describe Brahmans. The kapnobatai might thus have been a caste who were separate from the rest of the population due to requirements of ritual purity, and they might have lived a form of extreme asceticism and practice of deep trance in a way similar to Indic yogīs and the Faliscan Hirpi Sorani.

==== Asceticism ====
Strabo also recorded that there was a group of ascetics among the Thracians, called the ktistai (κτίσται), meaning lit. 'founders', who lived celibate lives and therefore were honourable, due to which they were dedicated to the gods and lived free of any fear. The asceticism of these Thracians was so famous in the ancient world that Flavius Josephus compared them with the Essenes.

The Dacian high priest Decaenus might have been an ascetic, as suggested by how he convinced the Dacians to destroy their vineyards and live without consuming wine.

=== Mystery cults ===
The worshippers of Zalmoxis performed initiatory rites as part of their cult, during which the priest lived in a cave as a reenactment of the descent of Zalmoxis into his underground chamber: the priest who was representative of Zalmoxis lived in a real cave but was near-invisible and seen only by the king and some attendants because he and his successors lived very secluded lives, thus showing that Thracian religion had preserved archaic elements which had already disappeared in Greek religion.

According to the account of Rhesus recorded by Euripides, his mother declared that Persephone would release his soul so that Rhesus will live hidden in a cavern as an anthrōpodaimōn. Thus, Rhesus had a role in mystery rites which Greeks perceived as being not unlike their own mysteries, and the use of the term "anthrōpodaimōn" to describe him means that Rhesus was believed to have a status between that of a man and a deity.

=== Festivals ===
In his record of the meeting between the Getic king Kothelas with the Macedonian king Philip II, Jordanes described a vast ritual procession in which participated members of different social orders, as well as musicians among whom were priests who wore white robes and played kitharai.

==== Bendidia ====
The festival of Bendidia, performed in honour of the goddess Bendis, was one of the main Thracian harvest festivals.

=== Feasts ===
Ancient Thracian rulers considered feasts to be an important aspect of maintaining their dominant status, and the Thracians borrowed the use of elite and communal feasts as models of social identity and interaction from the Mycenaean Greeks, who had themselves borrowed this practice from West Asians. Therefore, Thracians used to feast both on normal occasions as well as on a ritual basis, and used feasting to display status and affiliation to elige groups.

The process of feasting consisted of preparation for bathing, then bathing itself, followed by anointing, then sitting in a chair with a footstool, after which the hands were washed, and food and drink were served in vessels of gold and silver.

According to Ancient Greek authors, the king Kotys I used to feast and sacrifice to the gods in "places shaded with trees and watered by flowing streams."

The king Seuthes II gave a feast during which he shared bread and meat with Xenophon of Athens's Greek army to declare his alliance, after which wine was served to the feasters in horns likely made of precious metals and gifts were exchanged.

=== Fire rituals ===
The Thracian "Dionysos" might have been worshipped in fire rituals during which the participants carry sacred objects called empyra and danced on embers. Due to this, this god was invoked under the name of Pyribromos.

=== Royal rituals ===
Certain rituals were performed in relation to the king, such as investitutes and hierogamies.

The union between the king and the goddess was believed to be necessary for him to obtain royal power, and the Odrysian king Kotys I believed that the Thracian goddess Bendis, under the guise of the Greek virgin goddess Athena, had agreed to become his spouse, and he therefore prepared a bridal chamber where he waited for her, while a plaque from the Letnitsa treasure explicitly depicted the sexual intercourse between the hero and the goddess. This episode might however have been nothing more than a satirical anecdote written by Athenaeus of Naucratis for an Athenian audience rather than a true act of ritual.

=== Sacrifices ===
Some sacrifices, both in sanctuaries and in funerary rituals, consisted of intentionally breaking or deforming certain objects.

==== Offerings ====
Herodotus of Halicarnassus described Thracian and Paeonian women as bringing offerings wrapped in straw to a goddess whom he identified with Artemis Basileia (lit. 'Artemis the Queen').

===== Food sacrifices =====
Other ritual activity was associated with the table, where portions of food and drink were set aside for the gods and burnt or offered with libation at banquets, as was performed by Kotys I.

Libations using rhyta and phialai were a Thracian practice, and one rhyton from Poroina Mare in Romania was decorated with the image of a goddess holding a rhyton. Many phialai, rhyta and jugs, largely made of silver, have been found in Thrace.

===== Burnt sacrifices =====
Burnt sacrifices for the celestial deities were performed everywhere in Thrace and are physically attested by altars in Kabyle's and Seuthopolis's agoras.

==== Treasure sacrifices ====
Vessels such as gold goblets and bowls were given in dedication to chthonic deities during the Late Bronze Age in Thrace, mirroring similar practices among the Mycenaean Greeks and the Hittites.

Hoards of precious metal objects were also buried in Iron Age rural Thrace in pit-sanctuaries.

===== Offering pits =====
One form of sacrifice attested among Thracians is the practice of depositing offerings in pits and trenches, with the pits themselves being of different sizes as well as being of vascular, beehive, conical, cylindrical and oval shapes. This was the main sacrificial practice at sanctuaries in the lowlands, which consisted of the offering of ritual objects such as models, clay figurines, and amulets, or domestic artifacts such as utensils, ornaments, clothes, tools, and weapons, as offerings in pits.

Additionally, fragments of wall plaster and domestic hearths, as well as positions of sacrificial meals, occasionally whole animals, and even human sacrifices were also present in these sites. These sacrifices were performed by the worshippers to obtain help from the deity or to acknowledge said deity's support.

This form of below-ground deposits as sacrifice was very common in Thrace, and was form of sacrifice typical of Continental Europe rather than Aegean ones like the Ancient Greek ones.

Some offering-pits were located in nekropoleis: food was deposited in pits as offerings to the chthonic deities, to heroes, and to the dead: pits in cemeteries were located inside and under burial mounds, with the offerings intended to be food for the dead as part of tomb cults, but also as part of rituals for deified mortals in the form of hero cults.

These pits were one of the various locations where rituals were performed, although they were not necessarily ritual pits or sanctuary sites; nonetheless, pits were also built at sanctuaries to deposit offerings or discard used ritual materials.

Groups of offering pits were often associated with sanctuaries or settlements.

Archaeological analysis of Thracian offering pits shows that they often contained layers of ash, although evidence of burning of objects from the pits is rare.

===== Animal sacrifice =====
Domestic animals were very common as food offerings in Thracian offering pits:

- 87 of the 137 pits below the 3rd mound at Kralevo contained animal bones, with the average pit containing between two and four different animals, and 300 out of the 328 sacrificed animals were domestic, consisting of cattle (33.71% of sacrifices), pigs (28.03%), sheep (33.33%), goats, horses (4.93%), and dogs;
- in the offering pits at Bagachina, the offerings from over the course of the 5th to the 2nd centuries BCE consisted of individual cattle (28.91%), sheep or goat (14.06%), pig (29.18%), horse (4.15%), dog (1.86%), deer (11.67%), wild boar (5.83%), bear (1.33%):
  - of these, the largest number of bones were of cattle (56.52%), followed by pigs (16.82%), after which goats and sheep and other domestic animals together amounted to 16.2%
- dogs and horses were rarely sacrificed, with neither being butchered for meat, while the dogs' whole bodies were buried after they had been decapitated;
- most of the sacrificed cattle were adults, and calves constituted the majority of the younger sacrificed cattle, while piglets were preferentially sacrificed rather than adult pigs, and both adult and young sheep and goats were sacrificed;
- the remains of the bones found in the sacrificial pits show signs that they had not been burnt, that their meat had been carefully removed, and that they were primarily constituted leg joints and skulls and horn cores as well as cattle ribs and vertebrae
  - this suggests that the best cuts of the animals were used for consumption by humans, and that the parts offered in sacrifice were the "divine portions," similar to the Ancient Greek sacrificial practice.

At Bagachina, at most 15 pits contained horse bones and at most 7 pits contained dog bones, although none of them were complete or even partial skeletons. It is unknown whether they were part of the same deposits, and their relation to the association of horses and dogs with upper class funerary rituals as well as to the Ancient Greek practice of sacrificing horses and dogs in chthonic rituals are still unknown.

The remains of hunted animals such as deer, wild boars, hares, martens, foxes, and badgers, were more rarely deposited in the sacrificial pits, although the martens, foxes and badgers were not food offerings since they had been hunted for their fur.

Humans appear to have not been sacrificed in the Thracian offering pits.

The very young age of some of the animals buried in the Thracian sacrificial pits suggests that they had been buried around the months of May and July, implying that these sacrifices were related to a specific phase of the agricultural year.

===== Human sacrifice =====
The Thracians also practised human sacrifices:

- the god Pleistoros was offered human sacrifices;
- The ruler of the tribe of the Caeni, Diegylis, had sacrificed two young Greeks in 145 BCE, and claimed that kings could not offer the same sacrificial victims as commoners.

Every four years, the Thracian tribe of the Getae would chose an individual by lot who would be sacrificed as a messenger to Zalmoxis:

- the man was given the message for Zalmoxis while still alive, and was then sacrificed by being thrown on the sharp points of spears;
- if the sacrifice died, he was believed to have been favoured by Zalmoxis, but if he survived he was considered unworthy of being the messenger for the god.

This sacrifice was related to the story of death and resurrection of Zalmoxis after three years, since it was performed to summon Zalmoxis every four years to a ritual which made its participants immortal.

===== Other sacrifices =====
Gifts such as clothes, jewellery, and vessels were deposed for the gods as sacrifice in the extramural sanctuaries, some being on mountain-tops which might have been sites of Thracian solar cult practices.

== Syncretism ==
=== Scythian ===
When the Scythians migrated into the Pontic Steppe in the early 1st millennium BCE, their religion absorbed the fertility cults of the agricultural Thracian populations already living there. As part of this process, the Thracian goddess Bendis influenced the Scythian goddess Artimpasa.

Names of some of the main Scythian masculine deities were of Thracian origin and absorbed by the Scythians, and strong parallels existed between the Scythian and Thracian religions as result.

=== Phrygian ===
Onomastic correspondences between Phrygia and Bithynia, as well as finds of Phrygian texts within Bithynia, suggest that Bithynia was culturally close to Phrygia and shared essentiasl characteristics of its religious traditions with the Phrygian religion.

=== Graeco-Roman ===
In addition to the Thracian elite's willingness to adopt foreign ideas and practices, the Greek colonisation of the Black Sea coast and Macedonian conquest of Thrace, in addition to the Roman conquest, also brought in strong foreign influences. This process was especially concentrated in the ethnically diverse cities and towns, while more rural communities were more conservative and followed the traditional Thracian cult.

==== Greek influence ====
Due to the geographical proximity of the ancient Greeks and Thracians, there was significant circulation of their respective religious beliefs among each other: the Thracian religious world was filled with Greek notions, thus reflecting the Greek interest in Thrace.

Greek deities also decorated imported objects made by Greek craftsmen as commissions for Thracian patrons and in imitations of these by Thracian artisans, and it appears that Thracian society was significantly Hellenised: beginning in the 5th century BCE, decorated items imported by the Thracians, especially tableware such as the Panagyurishte rhyta and amphorae, were decorated with depictions of Greek gods and myths, suggesting that stories like the judgement of Paris, the Dionysian or Kabeiric scene on a jug from the Borovo treasure, and Thracian copies of the myths of Heracles on a jug from the Rogozen Treasure and a silver plaque from a kurgan near Panagyurishte, were popular in Thrace. Evidence of the affiliation of the Thracian upper class to Greek culture is also attested by how Greek singers sung praises of Sparta and Thebes at the wedding of the daughter of Kotys I to the Greek general Iphicrates.

However, Hellenistic depictions of native Thracian religious scenes which borrowed Greek imagery suggest that indigenous Thracian religious themes were also represented using Greek artistic conventions.

Therefore, there is a question of the interpretation of these religious images: the evidence is separated into Thracian and Hellenising tendencies, where non-Greek names of deities and imagery which cannot be recognised as Greek are of native Thracian provenance, while the deities who bore Greek names or had a Greek appearance are more challenging, with there being uncertainty on whether they were Greek gods who were worshipped by Thracians or merely a functional translation by Greeks which was adopted by Thracians and is interpreted in modern research as interpretation Thracica of Greek religious concepts.

The presence of cults of deities known by Greek names in the Thracian interior lands have been traditionally assumed to have been the result of Greek influence beginning with the rule of Philip II of Macedon. However, evidence is lacking for this interpretation, largely due to lack of evidence from the Hellenistic period. The Thracians cults of "Dionysos" and "Phōsphoros" appear instead to have been indigenous.

Nevertheless, the Thracian religious cults became more clearly Hellenised after the campaign of Philip II of Macedon in Thrace in 342-340 BCE.

===== The Bendidia at Athens =====
The Greek city-state of Athens officially recognised the Bendidia festival so that Thracians living there could celebrate one of their primary festivals. This festival was celebrated on the 19th of the month of Thargelion, and during it both Thracian and Greek worshippers of Bendis separately led processions from the prytaneion in Athens to the Piraeus, where was located the sanctuary of the goddess.

During the festival, riders passed torches to one another while racing their horses, and the procession from Athens to the sanctuary of Bendis on Munychia Hill was divided in two, with one group being the Athenian locals and the other being Thracians following their own ancestral traditions and the Athenian laws.

The positive and enthusiastic reception of the Bendidia at Athens suggests that the cult was both compatible with Athenian religious customs, and was also viewed favourably by the population of the city, hence why the Bendidia was celebrated at Athens for a long period of time.

===== Kotytto in Greece =====
Eupolis mentioned a cult of the goddess Kotytto in Athens, although this may have been a comedic creation of his. However, Kotytto was also worshipped in Corinth, Selinous in Magna Graecia, and in Asia Minor.

==== Roman influence ====
===== In Moesia =====
Under Roman rule, the organisation of Thracian religion changed significantly, with the priests being integrated into the Roman imperial administrative hierarchy and the offices of magistrates in the provincial administration and municipalities. Official Roman cults, as well as new gods, including the most popular ones in the Roman Empire, amongst whom were West Asian and Egyptian deities, were also introduced in Thrace: the cults introduced by the Roman Empire were linked to the official propaganda of imperial power, and included the triad of Jupiter Optimus Maximus, Juno Regina, and Minerva Augusta, as well as other deities such as Dea Roma and the then ruling emperor himself.

These new cults were especially popular in the Roman army, as well as with Italian settlers who participated in the Roman administration, and amongst merchants and priests, especially those living in the provinces of Moesia Superior and Inferior. The Roman imperial worship and religious propaganda was centred on the administrative centres, with augustales being attested in Ratiaria, Oescus, and Novae, while pontifices were present in Ratiaria, Oescus and Troesmis, and delegates at Tomis elected a sacerdus provinciae to perform the Imperial cult on a yearly basis.

The Roman cults in Thrace included those of Genii, Diana and Apollo, Hercules, Mercury, Ceres, Liber Pater, Proserpina, Pluto, and Silvanus, while single dedications to Victoria, Concordia and Nemesis are also attested. They were largely located in frontier provinces such as Moesia Superior and Moesia Inferior where the army was stationed and which were directly under imperial authority, and owed their popularity to the Roman army, which held privileges regarding official cults, the cult of Standards, and the cults of patron deities like Mars, Hercules, Fortuna, Victoria, and Bonus Eventus.

Following the Roman conquest, images of deities and written dedications to the gods such as altars, stone reliefs, and statues first appeared in Thrace, with temples especially being built for Roman cults in the new cities which the Roman Empire founded in Moesia:

- at the end of Trajan's rule, a Capitolium consisting of three temples with an altar to Jupiter Optimus Maximus was built at Oescus;
- the military camp of Montana contained a large sanctuary of Diana and Apollo, who were there worshipped in the Roman way;
- within the inner courtyard of the valetudinarium of Legio Italica I's camp in Novae was a sanctuary of Asclepius and Hygia.

Most official altar dedications in Roman cults were located close to military camps, cities and towns.

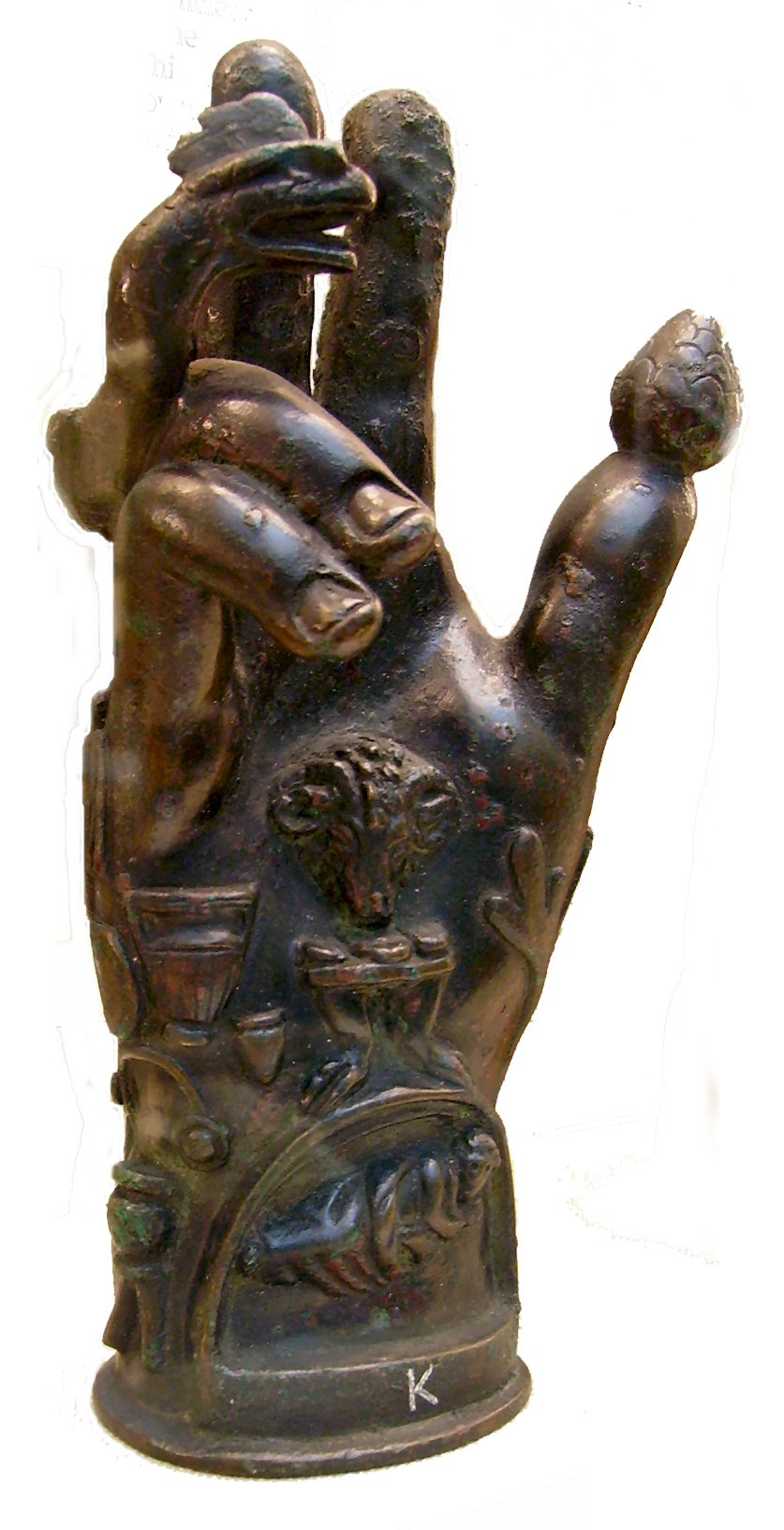
Hand-shaped amulet of Sabazius. 1st-2nd centuries CE.

Many of the Thracian cults attested in later periods had however most likely already been established before the Roman conquest of Thrace.

The Thracian Horseman was however the most popular deity among the native Thracian soldiers, who occupied the lower ranks of the Roman army and did not usually appeal to foreign deities, with principales actively participating in Roman cults and officials mainly performing the official cults and the cult of the reigning emperor, while the centuriones offered individual dedications to the Thracian Horseman.

===== In Thracia =====
The official Roman cults were however less popular in the province of Thracia, where the Capitoline triad is not attested, although the Greek deities Zeus and Hera were worshipped there:

- At Philippopolis, the Imperial cult was organised by the Thracian koinon and performed by an archierus, who was the chief priest of the city's main cult of Apollo Kendrisos during the reign of Trajan, and under the reign of Elagabalus the city received the title of neokoria and the duties linked to it were performed by the thracarch, which was an office held by individuals with typically Thracian names;
- At Augusta Traiana, the archiereus officiated his priestly role along with his wife, and he had used his own funds to pay for the dedication of a statue to Marcus Aurelius.

The Thracian koinon lived in Philippopolis, and, beginning with the reign of Commodus, the Imperial Cult was performed there through Pythian Games, which were renamed as Alexandrian Games by Caracalla and Kendrisian Games by Elagabalus. The cult of the emperor was performed with gladiatorial games at Augusta Traiana.

Within the province of Thracia itself, Greek deities were the more popular ones:

- Zeus and Hera were honoured either individually or together in the western part of the province, such as at Serdica, Pautalia, and in sanctuaries in the Strymon valley, with Cicero mentioning a sanctuary of Jupiter Svelsurdos;
- Apollo was also popular in Thracia, where he was the main deity of Augusta Traiana and Philippopolis, having native Thracian priests at the former place and holding the epithet of Kendrisos at the latter one;
- Asclepius was popular, often together with Hygeia, in the western part of Thracia, and he had important cults at Pautalia and Serdica, and priests of his with Thracian names are known from Batkun;
- Dionysos was worshipped everywhere in Thrace, where he had many priests of largely native Thracian origin who headed religious organisations;
- Artemis, Hermes and Heracles are attested from Thracia, especially in urban centres, and native Thracian priests of Heracles are known from Pautalia.

These deities were worshipped with Thracian epithets, suggesting that their cults had already been established before the Roman period, although the late date of urbanisation at many cult centres other than Philippopolis means much about their origins is still uncertain. Egyptian cults such as those of Sarapis and Isis, and Anatolian ones like those of Cybele and Attis and of Hypsistos, were also present in Thrace, where they had been present since the Hellenistic period, although they had been limited to the Greek colonies; by the Roman period, single dedications to these deities and religious artifacts offered by Greek and West Asian settlers are attested in urban centres.

The cult of the Syrian god Jupiter Dolichenus was very popular among West Asian soldiers in Moesia Inferior, where he replaced the Roman cult of Jupiter.

The god Mithras is first attested in the military camps of Moesia, and later in Thracia, although his worshippers were mostly Greeks, Romans, or West Asians, but only rarely were native Thracians.

Within Thracia, most temples dedicated to Greek and Eastern cults were located in the towns where lived foreign settlers from the eastern parts of the Roman Empire. Thus, Thracians largely did not participate in the foreign cults introduced under Roman rule other than that of the Phrygian Sabazius, suggesting it originated in an ancient religious syncretism: even the priest of Sabazius in Serdica was Thracian.

== See also ==
- Paleo-Balkan mythology
- Illyrian mythology

== Sources ==
- Alvarez Dobroruka, Vicente (2019). "Eunus: royal obverse, messianic preacher, firebreather and avenger of Syria". Revista Diálogos Mediterrânicos [Mediterranean Dialogues Journal]. 17: 81–104. doi:10.24858/356.
- Archibald, Z. H. (1999). "Thracian Cult - from Practice to Belief". In Tsetskhladze, G.R. (ed.). Ancient Greeks West and East. Leiden, Netherlands: Brill. pp. 497–520. ISBN 978-9-004-11190-5.
- Chiekova, Dobrinka (2011). "Greek and Thracian Religious Traditions in the Greek Cities on the Western Black Sea Coast". In Badoud, Nathan (ed.). Philologos Dionysos: Mélanges offerts au professeur Denis Knoepfler [Philologos Dionysos: Mixed Writings Offered to the Professor Denis Knoepfler]. Geneva, Switzerland: Librairie Droz. pp. 517–532. ISBN 978-2-600-01506-6.
- Chiekova, Dobrinka (2023). "The Great Mother Goddess on the Thracian Coast of Pontos Euxeinos: Forms and Traditions". Ancient Civilizations from Scythia to Siberia. 29 (1): 11–37. doi:10.1163/15700577-20232902.
- Fitzpatrick, Scott M. (2018). Ancient Psychoactive Substances. Gainesville, United States: University Press of Florida. ISBN 978-0-813-05670-8.
- Holubeanu, Ionuț (2024). Christianity in Roman Scythia: Ecclesiastical Organization and Monasticism (4th to 7th Centuries). Leiden, Netherlands: Brill Publishers. ISBN 978-9-004-69054-7.
- Oreshko, Rostyslav (2021). "In Search of the Holy Cube Roots: Kubaba—Kubeleya—Κύβεβος—Kufaws and the Problem of Ethnocultural Contact in Early Iron Age Anatolia". In Bianconi, Michele (ed.). Linguistic and Cultural Interactions between Greece and Anatolia: In Search of the Golden Fleece. Leiden, Netherlands: Brill Publishers. pp. 131–166. ISBN 978-9-004-46159-8.
- Rabadjiev, Kostadin (2015). "Religion". In Valeva, Julia; Nankov, Emil; Graninger, Denver (eds.). A Companion to Ancient Thrace. Blackwell Companions to the Ancient World. Malden, United States: Wiley-Blackwell. pp. 443–456. ISBN 978-1-444-35104-0.
- Rabadjiev, Kostadin (2022). "The Thracian gods: The puzzle of anthropomorphism". In Delev, Peter; Stoyanov, Totko; Yanakieva, Svetlana; Popov, Hristo; Bozkova, Anelia; Vassileva, Maya; Tzvetkova, Julia; Damyanov, Margarit; Ilieva, Petya; Emilov, Juliy (eds.). Ancient Thrace: Myth and reality–Proceedings of the Thirteenth International Congress of Thracology. Vol. 2. Sofia, Bulgaria: St. Kliment Ohridski University Press. pp. 283–296. ISBN 978-954-07-5622-6.
- Rabadjiev, Kostadin (2025). "The Thracians and Their Religion". In Spier, Jeffrey; Potts, Timothy; Cole, Sara E.; Damyanov, Margarit (eds.). Ancient Thrace and the Classical World: Treasures from Bulgaria, Romania, and Greece. Los Angeles, United States: Getty Publications. pp. 57–66. ISBN 978-1-606-06941-7.
- Shelley, William Scott (2018). Soma and the Indo-European Priesthood: Cereal Cultivation and the Origins of Religion. New York City, United States: Algora Publishing. ISBN 978-1-628-94353-5.
- Sulimirski, T. (1985). "The Scyths". In Gershevitch, I. (ed.). The Median and Achaemenian Periods. The Cambridge History of Iran. Vol. 2. Cambridge, United Kingdom: Cambridge University Press. pp. 149–199. ISBN 978-1-139-05493-5.
- Ustinova, Yulia (1999). The Supreme Gods of the Bosporan Kingdom: Celestial Aphrodite and the Most High God. Leiden, Netherlands; Boston, United States: BRILL. ISBN 978-9-004-11231-5.
- Ustinova, Yulia (2009). Caves and the Ancient Greek Mind: Descending Underground in the Search for Ultimate Truth. Oxford, United Kingdom: Oxford University Press. ISBN 978-0-199-54856-9.
- Ustinova, Yulia (2021). "Hirpi Sorani and Modern Fire-Walkers: Rejoicing through Pain in Extreme Rituals". In Alvar Nuño, Antón; Alvar Ezquerra, Jaime; Woolf, Greg (eds.). SENSORIVM: The Senses in Roman Polytheism. Leiden, Netherlands: BRILL. pp. 71–89. ISBN 978-9-004-45974-8 – via Academia.
- Valeva, Julia (2015). "Gold, Silver, and Bronze Vessels". In Valeva, Julia; Nankov, Emil; Graninger, Denver (eds.). A Companion to Ancient Thrace. Blackwell Companions to the Ancient World. Malden, United States: Wiley-Blackwell. pp. 197–211. ISBN 978-1-444-35104-0.
