= Zalmoxianism =

Neopagan movement in Romania

Zalmoxianism (Romanian: Zalmoxianism) or Zamolxianism (Romanian: Zamolxianism) is a Neopagan movement in Romania which promotes the rebuilding of an ethnic religion and spirituality of the Romanians through a process of reconnection to their ancient Dacian and Thracian roots. The religion takes its name from Zalmoxis or Zamolxe, at the same time the name of the primordial god and the archetype of the enlightened man in Paleo-Balkan mythology. Scholars Bakó and Hubbes (2011) have defined Zalmoxianism, like the other ethnic religious revivals of Europe, as a reconstructionist ethno-paganism.

== Origins ==
The reconstruction of ancient Dacian and Thracian religion and mythology has been strictly connected with the field of dacology. Amongst contemporary supporters of Zalmoxianism, the emigrant dacologist Octavian Sărbătoare even proposed to make it the official religion of Romania.

=== Academic knowledge of ancient Zalmoxianism ===
According to Dan Dana, Herodotus "constitutes the singular pertinent ancient source regarding Zalmoxis." Zoe Petre stated that all theories about Zamolxianism are mere speculations, with Herdotodus being the only author who knew one of its moments. Ion Pogorilovschi wrote that the cosmogonic worldview of the Geto-Dacians remains unknown in ancient sources.

== Organisations ==
=== The Gebeleizis Society ===
The "Gebeleizis Society" (Romanian: Societatea Gebeleizis), though far from being the only Zalmoxian group in Romania, has been the most studied formation. It has 500 members split into 15 branches. The core values of the organisation are expressed by its motto "One Family, One Nation, One Territory" (Romanian: O Familie, Un Neam, Un Teritoriu); for the ideas promoted, the Gebeleizis Society has been subject of media scandal, and accused of extremism.

=== Zamolxe group ===
Another group is the Zamolxe, based in Bucharest, whose high priest is Alexandru Mihail. They worship the old Thraco-Dacian pantheon of gods, and claim that the name "Zalmoxis" comes from zamol, meaning "earth".

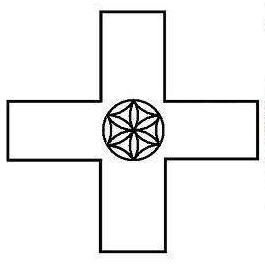
Symbol of Zamolxiana New Religious Movement.

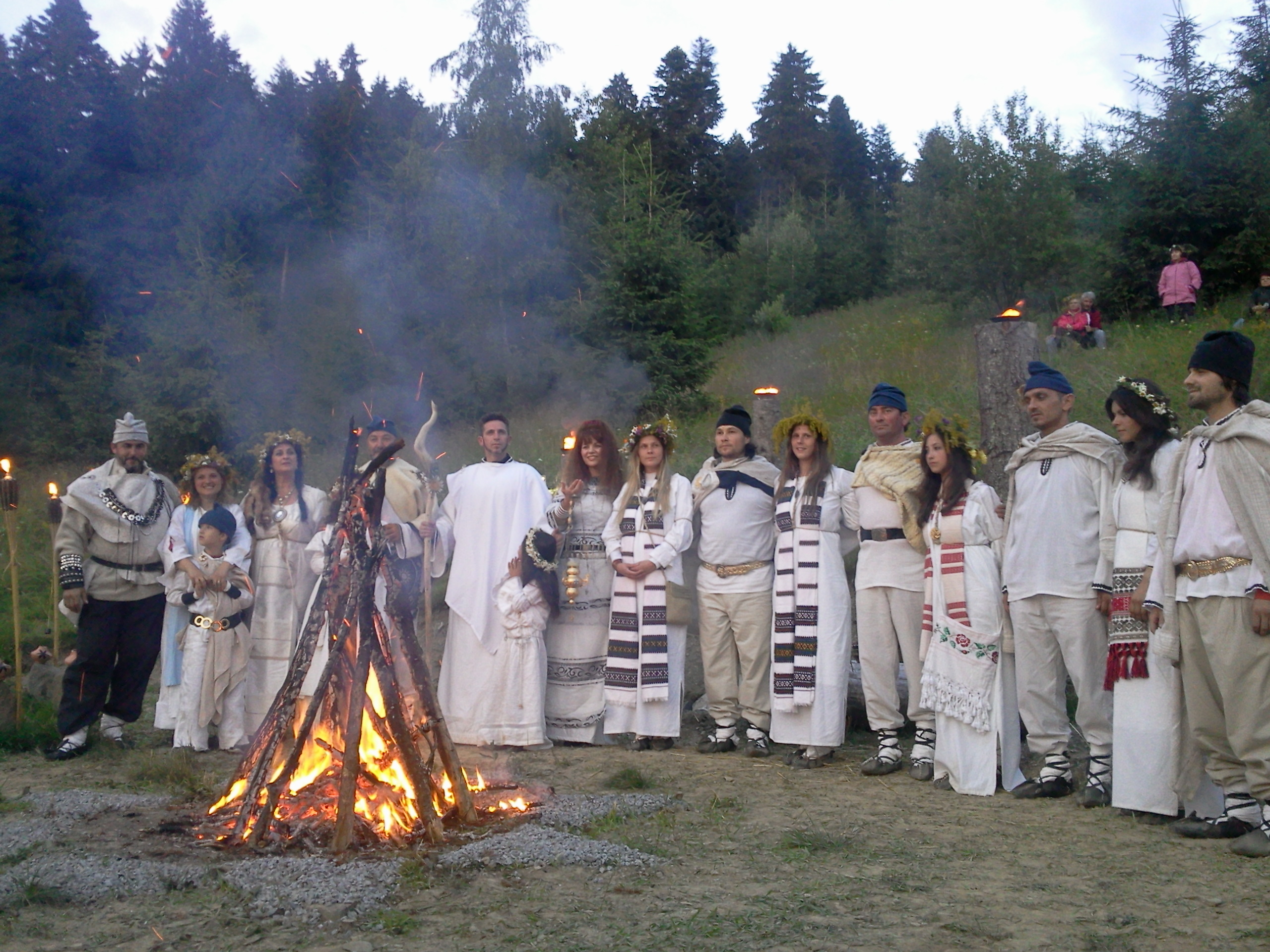
Dacian Sacred Fire ceremony at Detunata temple during 2013 in Romania.

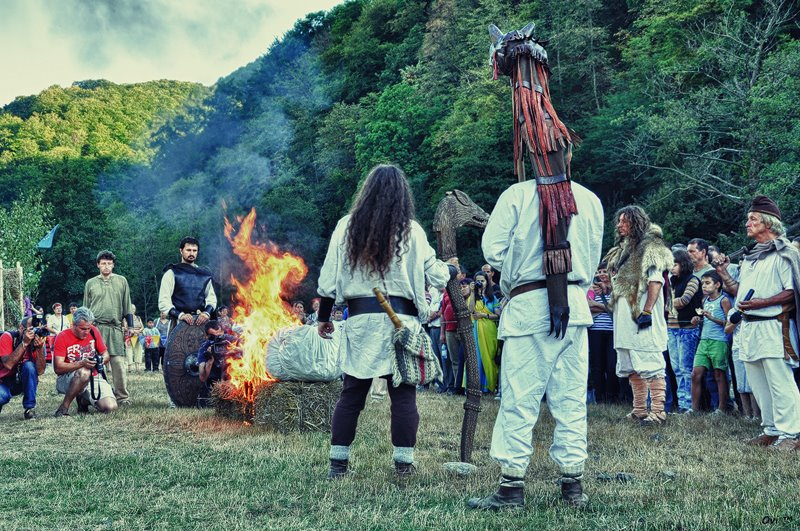
The Dacian Sacred Fire at Costesti, Romania, in 2012.

=== Eastern Pagan Front ===
The Eastern Pagan Front (Romanian: Frontul Păgân de Răsărit), is a Romanian Zalmoxian group based in Bucharest, whose purpose consists "in the investigation, research and recovery of old traditions, of authentic Thracian-Dacian values, their knowledge and the raising of new generations of ethnic Romanians in the spirit of Zalmoxianism".

The group largely operated on Telegram, often posting paragraphs, photos, and more with an anti-Christian sentiment and a pro-Pagan perspective. They were at times recognized as a National-Socialist group, known for its pro-folkish outlook on Paganism.

As of late 2025, the group is no longer operational on the internet, with its Telegram and YouTube channels having been deleted by the group's owners. Despite the group no longer being active on the internet as a whole, it continues to maintain a physical presence and an archive of some of its posts in a founder's own Telegram channel. The group was mentioned by the Elie Wiesel National Institute for Studying the Holocaust in Romania in its "report of monitorization of Anti-Semitism and Holocaust denial in the electoral year 2024-2025".

== See also ==
- Hungarian Neopaganism
- Slavic Neopaganism
- Protochronism

== Bibliography ==
- László-Attila Hubbes. Romanian Ethno-Paganism: Discourses of Nationalistic Religion in Virtual Space. In Native Faith and Neo-Pagan Movements in Central and Eastern Europe. Kaarina Aitamurto, Scott Simpson. Acumen Publishing, 2013. ISBN 1844656624
- Rozália Klára Bakó, László-Attila Hubbes. Religious Minorities' Web Rhetoric: Romanian and Hungarian Ethno-Pagan Organizations. Journal for the Study of Religions and Ideologies, vol. 10, issue 30, Winter 2011: 127–158. ISSN 1583-0039
