= Thracology =

Study of Ancient Thrace

Thracology (Greek: Θρακολογία; Bulgarian: Тракология, romanized: Trakologiya; Romanian: Tracologie) is the scientific study of Ancient Thrace and Thracian antiquities and is a regional and thematic branch of the larger disciplines of ancient history and archaeology. A practitioner of the discipline is a Thracologist. Thracology investigates the range of ancient Thracian culture (language, literature, history, religion, art, economics and ethics) from 1000 BC up to the end of Roman rule in the 4th–7th centuries AD. It is believed 'modern' Thracology (as opposed to an 'antiquarian' interest in the land of Thrace) started with the work of Wilhelm Tomaschek in the late 19th century.

== Thracology in Bulgaria ==
In the second part of the 20th century, Bulgarian historian Alexander Fol founded the Institute of Thracology in the Bulgarian Academy of Science. With subsequently ever-increasing Thracian tombs unearthing, the study of the Ancient Thracian civilization was able to proceed with greater academic rigor.

== Thracology in Romania ==
Since Dacians are considered a branch of the Thracians by most mainstream research and historical sources, Romanian historians and archaeologists have also been heavily involved in Thracology since at least the 19th century. The related term Thraco-Dacology also exists, alluding to Thraco-Dacian, and one of the first uses is from around 1980, in the Romanian government archive.

But since other theories sustain that Daco-Thracian relation is not as strong as originally thought, Dacology may evolve as an independent discipline from Thracology. The terms Dacology/Dacologist have been negatively affected by the association with protochronism and risk to be severely compromised, prompting some reputable Romanian researchers to call themselves Thracologists instead of Dacologists, even in the context of their research being focused more on Dacians than on Thracians, and even without necessarily promoting a strong connection between the two peoples.

The Romanian Thracology Institute I.G Bibicescu, part of Romanian Academy and based in Bucharest, was founded in 1976, after the 2nd International Congress of Thracology held in September of same year in Bucharest. One of his first directors was the thracologist Dumitru Berciu (1907–1998).

== Thracologists ==
Researchers who have been noted in the field of Thracology include:

- Gavril Katsarov – Bulgarian historian, classical philologist and archeologist
- Vladimir I. Georgiev – Bulgarian linguist
- Georgi Kitov – Bulgarian archaeologist
- Alexander Fol – Bulgarian Thracologist
- Ion Niculiță – Moldovan archaeologist
- Sorin Olteanu – Romanian Thracologist, focused on Thraco-Daco-Moesian languages
- Engin Beksac – Turkish archaeologist and art historian
- Bogdan Petriceicu Hasdeu – Romanian Daco-Thracologist and historian
- Ion I. Russu- Romanian Daco-Thracologist and historian
- Dumitru Berciu – Director of the Romanian Thracology Institute
- Margarita Tacheva – Bulgarian Thracologist

== International Congress of Thracology ==
The International Congress of Thracology was organised by the Institute of Thracology at the Bulgarian Academy of Sciences. It has been held regularly since 1972 when it was founded by Alexander Fol. Fol himself became the chairman of the congress, and emphasized an international approach to the study of Thracology.

International Congresses of Thracology
Number	Hosted in	Date	Theme
1	Sofia, Bulgaria	July 1972	
2	Bucharest, Romania	September 1976	
3	Vienna, Austria	June 1980	
4	Rotterdam, The Netherlands	September 1984	
5	Moscow, Soviet Union	1988	
6	Palma de Mallorca, Spain	1992	
7	Constanța, Tulcea, Mangalia, Romania	May 1996	Thracians and Myceneans
8	Sofia and Yambol, Bulgaria	September 2000	Thracians and the Aegean
9	Chișinău, Moldova	September 2004	Thracians and the Circumpontic World
10	Komotini and Alexandroupolis, Greece	October 2005	
11	Istanbul, Turkey	October 2010	
12	Târgoviște, Romania	September 2013	The Thracians and their Neighbors in the Bronze and Iron Ages
13	Kazanlak, Bulgaria	September 2017	Ancient Thrace: Myth and Reality
14	Deva, Romania	May 2020, postponed to fall 2020 due to COVID-19	THRACing the Past: From Bronze Communities to Iron Kingdoms

=== Thracians and Myceneans ===
On September 21–26, 1984, the Fourth International Congress of Thracology was held in the Museum Boymans-van Beuningen in Rotterdam, Netherlands. The Congress was organized by the Henri Frankfort Foundation, which is a private institution whose main purpose is to augment the study of Mediterranean pre-history and proto-history. The opening of the symposium began on September 24 and was addressed by the Minister of Education and Science Dr. W. J. Deetman. "Thracians and Mycenaeans" was the theme name for the symposium, which held discussions pertaining to the potential ethnic, cultural, religious, and linguistic interrelations between proto-Thracians and proto-Greeks (i.e. Myceneans). It was believed that such interrelations had to exist since both groups have lived in the same geographic area in the past. According to Alexander Fol, the concept of "Mycenean Thrace" was first developed in 1973 in order to explain the relative cultural unity between the Thracians and the Myceneans.

== See also ==
- Bulgarian Academy of Sciences
- Thracians
- Thracian language
- Thracian mythology
- Thracian kings
- Thracian tribes
- Dacia
- Dacology

== Bibliography ==
- Best, Jan; De Vries, Nanny (1989). Thracians and Mycenaeans. Boston, Massachusetts: E.J. Brill Academic Publishers. ISBN 90-04-08864-4.
- Olteanu, Sorin. "Linguae Thraco-Daco-Moesorum" (in Romanian and English).
- Vulpe, Radu (1980). Actes du IIe Congrès international de thracologie: Linguistique, ethnologie (ethnographie, folkloristique et art populaire), anthropologie (in Romanian, English, and French). Bucharest: Editura Academiei.
- "Revista arhivelor". Revista arhivelor. 42. Romania: Arhivele Statului. 1980.
- "Dacia: Revue d'archéologie et d'histoire ancienne". Studii și Cercetări Lingvistice (in Romanian). 34 (3–6). București, Romania: Academia Română. 1983.
