= Pleistoros =

Thracian War God

Pleistoros was, according to Herodotus (The Histories, IX, 119), a Thracian god adored by the Gauls and the tribe "Absinthe" (Apsintieni) as the god of war. According to Josephus Flavius (in his Antiquities of the Jews, XVIII, 22). (Note: Compare (The Works of Flavius Josephus, Antiquities of Jews. Translated by William Whiston, A.M. 1895.) with (Complete works of Josephus. Translated by Haverkamp, Siwart. 1900.)) Pleistoros was the god of war Dacians pleistoi, to which these Thracians offered sacrifices of men. The priests were recruited between nobles, some of whom are warriors.
