= Ion Niculiță =

Moldovan archaeologist (1939–2022)

Professor, Dr. Ion Niculiță
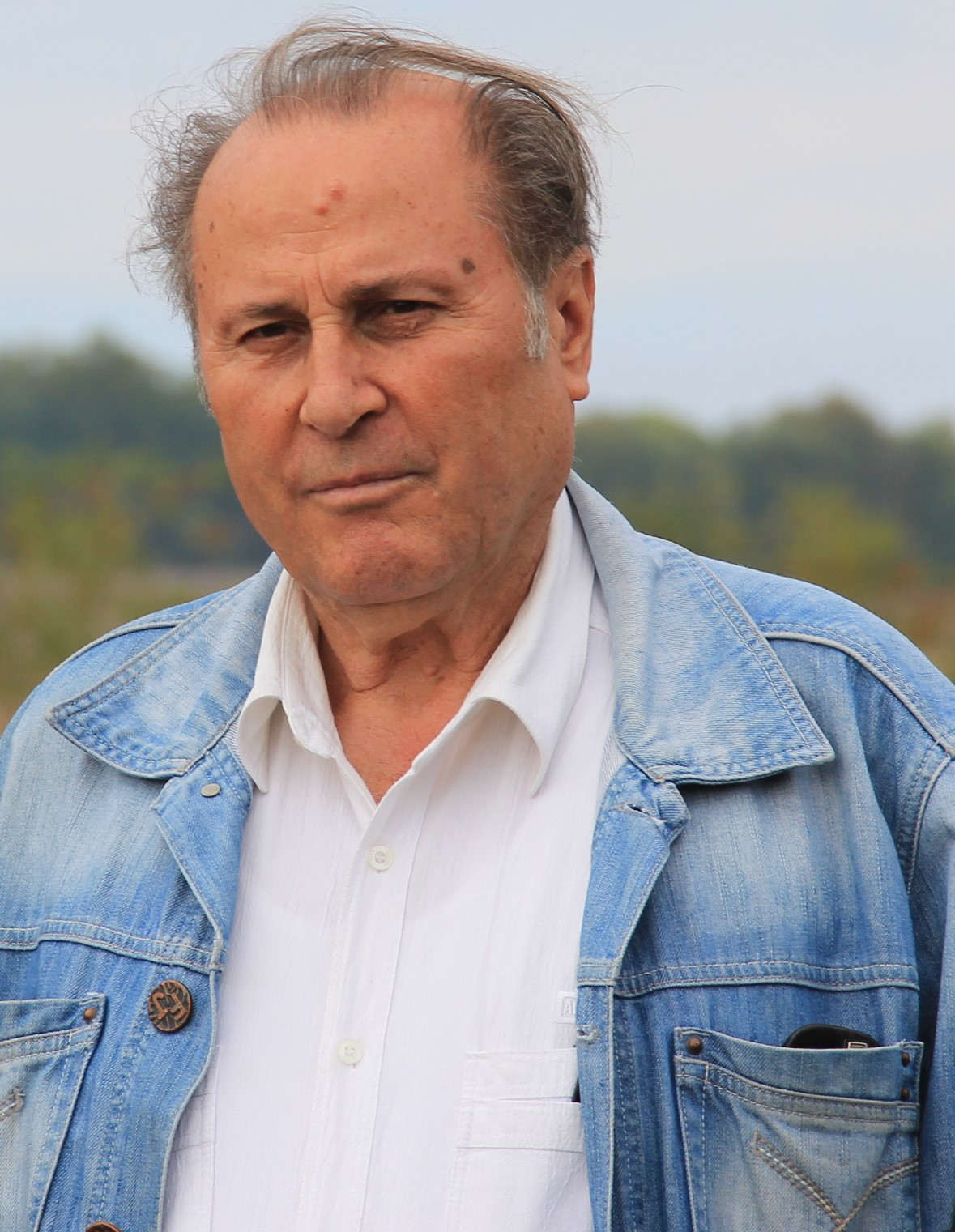
- Niculiță in 2012
- Born: 27 May 1939; Zârnești, Cahul District, Romania
- Died: 2 January 2022 (aged 82); Galați, Romania
- Education: Lomonosov Moscow State University
- Known for: Thracology
- Scientific career
- Fields: Archaeology
- Workplaces: Moldova State University
- Doctoral advisor: Irina Jacenko

Ion Niculiță (27 May 1939 – 2 January 2022) was a Moldovan professor of archaeology, known for his contributions to the field of thracology. He was a relative of the Romanian archaeologist Vasile Pârvan.

== Academic career ==
Returning to Moldova he was appointed lecturer in the Ancient and Medieval History Department. Advancing through the ranks, he became Chair of Archaeology and Ancient History in 1984, and between 1993 and 2002 he was Dean of the Faculty of History. In 1991 he obtained his habilitation in history for the work "Northern Thracians in the 6th through 1st Centuries BC".

Niculiță's scientific interests are focused on the cultural interactions in Southeast Europe between the end of the 2nd Millennium BC and the beginning of the 1st Millennium, in particular: ethnogenesis aspects of early Thracian history, Geto-Dacian history and civilization, Daco-Romanian continuity and processes of Romanization, etc.

In order to focus their research, Niculiță organized the Scientific Research Laboratory on Thracology in the Department of Archaeology and Ancient History in 1990. Under his leadership a number of archeological sites have been studied, such as Dănceni, Suruceni, Butuceni, Hansca, Sobari, Trebujeni, Mașcăuți, Saharna and those on the Lower Danube as well as Novosel'skoye and Orlivka (Kartal) in Ukraine.

In 1992 Niculiță was elected member of the International Council of Indo-European and Thracian Studies. He was a member of the editorial boards for scientific journals like SCIVA (Bucharest), Istros (Brăila), Cumidava (Brașov) and Tyrageția (Chișinău).

His efforts through 40 years have resulted in five monographs and more than 120 papers published in national and international journals.

== Personal life and death ==
Niculiță was born in Zărnești, Cahul District. Having attended school in his native village, he studied at the Faculty of History, University of Chișinău, from 1958 to 1963. Among his teachers were E. Rikman and R. Enghelgardt. As a first-year student, together with G. Samson, N. Grigoriev and V. Botnariuc he founded the Archeology Student Scientific Seminar (SȘSAIV), which continues to this day.

Between 1963 and 1968 he worked as assistant to the chair of universal history at the Faculty of History, and 1968–1971 he was a PhD student of archeology at the Lomonosov Moscow State University, studying under such teachers as B. Rybakov, B. Grakov, A. Arcyhovskii, V. Janin, F. Kyzlasov, A. Meliukova and I. Jacenko. His thesis, submitted in 1972, was about the Getae east of the Carpathians in the 4th and 3rd centuries BC.

He died on 2 January 2022, at the age of 82.

== Selected publications ==
- Niculiță, Ion; Sîrbu, Valeriu (2007). "The Historical Evolution of Budjak in the 1st–4th c. AD. A few observations". ISTROS. XIV: 195–204.
- Niculiță, Ion (2007). "Contributions made to the study of the burial rite performed by the communities inhabiting East of the Carpathians in the 3rd C. B.C. – 3rd C. A.D." (PDF). Acta Terrae Septemcastrensis. VI (1): 71–73. ISSN 1583-1817. OCLC 183256825.
- Niculiță, Ion; Zanoci, Aurel; Arnăut, Tudor (2007). "Fortifications of the Early Iron Age settlement Saharna Mare". Tyragetia. serie nouă. I [XVI] (1).
- Arnăut, T.; Zanoci, A.; Matveev, S., eds. (1999). Studia in Honorem Ion Niculiță: Omagiu cu prilejul implinirii a 60 de ani [Festschrift on the occasion of his 60th birthday] (in Romanian). Chișinău: Cartdidact. ISBN 9975-940-20-X.
