= Cosingas =

1st century BC Thracian Cebrenii chieftain

Cosingas was a chieftain of the Thracian Cebrenii, the Sycaeboae, and a priest of Hera.

== See also ==
- List of Thracian tribes
