= Tachev =

Tachev (Bulgarian: Тачев), female Tacheva is a Bulgarian surname. Notable people with the surname include:

- Petar Tachev (born 1938), Bulgarian weightlifter
- Vasil Tachev (born 1992), Bulgarian footballer
- Margarita Tacheva (1936–2008), Bulgarian historian
