= Aleksandar Fol =

Bulgarian historian and Thracologist (1933–2006)

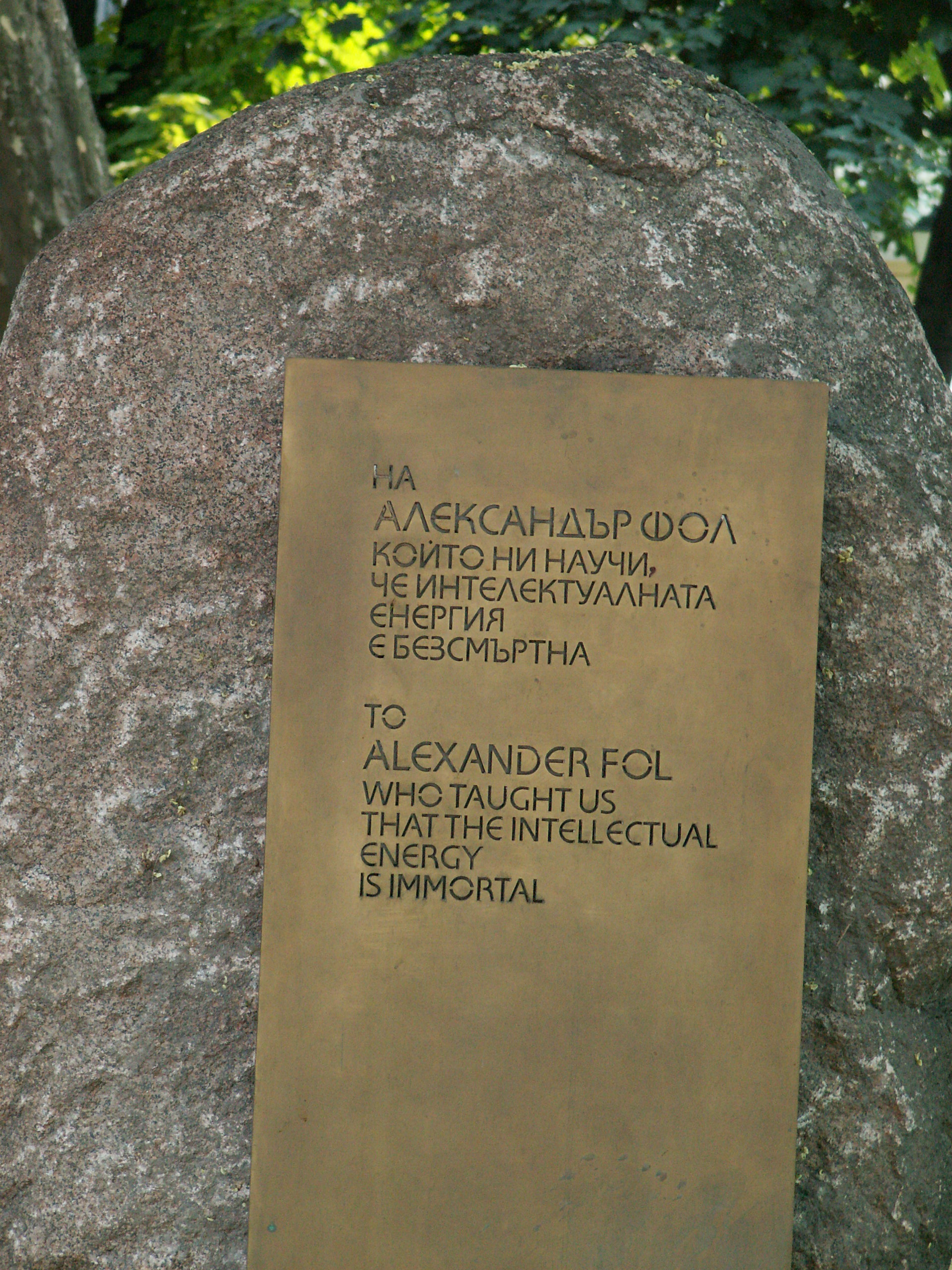
Monument to Alexander Fol in Sofia, Bulgaria.

Alexander Fol (Bulgarian: Александър Фол) (born in Sofia, Bulgaria on July 3, 1933; died in Sofia on March 1, 2006) was a Bulgarian historian and Thracologist. In 1957, he studied history at the University of St. Kliment Ohridski in Sofia and earned a PhD in 1966. He worked as a university lecturer from 1972 and became a professor in 1975. From 1980 to 1986, he served as Minister of Culture and Education of Republic of Bulgaria. His research interests lay in classical Greek and Roman history, the cultural history of southeast Europe and Asia Minor, and Indo-European studies. He is best known for his contributions to Thracology.

In 1972, he established the Institute of Thracology at the Bulgarian Academy of Sciences in Sofia, and became its first director until 1992. During this time he organized International Congresses of Thracology in Sofia, Bucharest, Vienna, Rotterdam, Moscow, and Palma de Mallorca. He was secretary-general of the International Council for Indo-European and Thracology Studies. He held a chair of Ancient History and Thracology at the University of Sofia between 1979 and 1987, and a chair of Cultural History of Southeastern Europe since 1991. He was the founder of the Bulgarian Research Institute in Vienna, and of the School for Antique Languages and Culture in Sofia (1977). Since 1983, he was director of archaeological excavations in the east Bulgarian village of Drama together with Jan Lichardus of the Institute of Prehistory and Early History at the Saarland University Saarbrücken (Germany).

Fol was a member of the Accademia Medicea in Florence, Italy. Moreover, he was a member of the German Archaeological Institute, the Académie Maison in Paris, France and the Leibniz-Sozietaet in Berlin. He received numerous invitations as guest lecturer in England, the United States, Russia, Germany, Japan, Greece, Italy, Sweden, and France. His publications comprise twelve monographies on Thracian social history, as well as several articles in the field of Thracology. Alexander Fol died of stomach cancer.
