= NGDEK =

Middle and high school in Sofia, Bulgaria

Coordinates: 42°43′35″N 23°16′14″E

The National School for Ancient Languages and Cultures "Saint Constantine-Cyril the Philosopher" (Bulgarian: Национална гимназия за древни езици и култури "Свети Константин Кирил Φилософ"), abbreviated in Bulgarian НГДЕК (NGDEK), is a high school, located in Sofia, Bulgaria.

It was founded in 1977 by Gergina Toncheva, who was the first principal of the school. The school was named after St. Constantine-Cyril "The Philosopher". The curriculum includes Latin, Ancient Greek, Old Bulgarian known also as Old Church Slavonic, Cultural Studies of Antiquity and History among others. Educational trips to Greece and Italy in the 9th and 10th grade are highlights of the comprehensive program. The principal of the school is Mariela Papazova since 2015 until she retires. The national day of the school is the 11 May.
