= Gavril Katsarov =

- Гаврил Илиев Кацаров
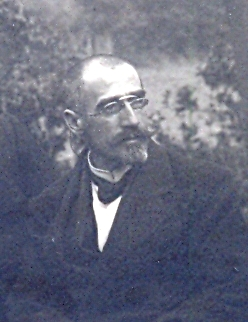
- Born: 4 October 1874; Koprivshtitsa, Ottoman Empire
- Died: 1 June 1958 (aged 83); Sofia, Bulgaria
- Resting place: Central Sofia Cemetery; 42°42′44.1″N 23°20′04.7″E
- Occupations: Archaeologist, Classical philologist

Gavril Iliev Katsarov (Bulgarian: Гаврил Илиев Кацаров) was a Bulgarian historian, classical philologist and archeologist. Rector of Sofia University. Director of the National Archaeological Museum and the Bulgarian Archeological Institute.

Adopted as the father of Bulgarian Thracology.

In 1899, he graduated with a doctorate in Classical Philology and Ancient History from Leipzig University. He specialized at the Friedrich Wilhelm University of Berlin and the Ludwig-Maximilians-Universität München (1901–1902), and then stayed in Italy in 1906.

Full member (academician) of the Bulgarian Academy of Sciences, (1909). Member of the Romanian Academy of Sciences (1936) and the Austrian Academy of Sciences (1939). Member of foreign companies and institutes.

== Selected publications ==
- The Athenian State System (1904).
- Contribution to the Ancient History of Sofia (1910).
- The Contract of Prince Ivanko, Son of Dobrotichev, with the Genoese in 1387 (co-authored with Vasil Zlatarski. Sofia. 1911.
- Sources for the Old History and Geography of Thrace and Macedonia (1915).
- Contributions to the History of Antiquity (1920).
- Paeonia: Contribution to the Ancient Ethnography and History of Macedonia (1921).
- King Philip II of Macedon: History of Macedonia until 336 BC (1922).
- Bulgaria in Antiquity: Historical and Archaeological Essay (1926).
- General and Bulgarian History for the Junior High School Course (1927).
- Katzarow, Gawril (1930). "Chapter XVII: Thrace". In Cook, S. A.; Adcock, F.E.; Charlesworth, M.P. (eds.). The Cambridge Ancient History; volume VIII; Rome and the Mediterranean 218-133 B.C. Cambridge: Cambridge At the University Press. pp. 534–560.
- Sources for the Ancient History and Geography of Thrace and Macedonia (1949).

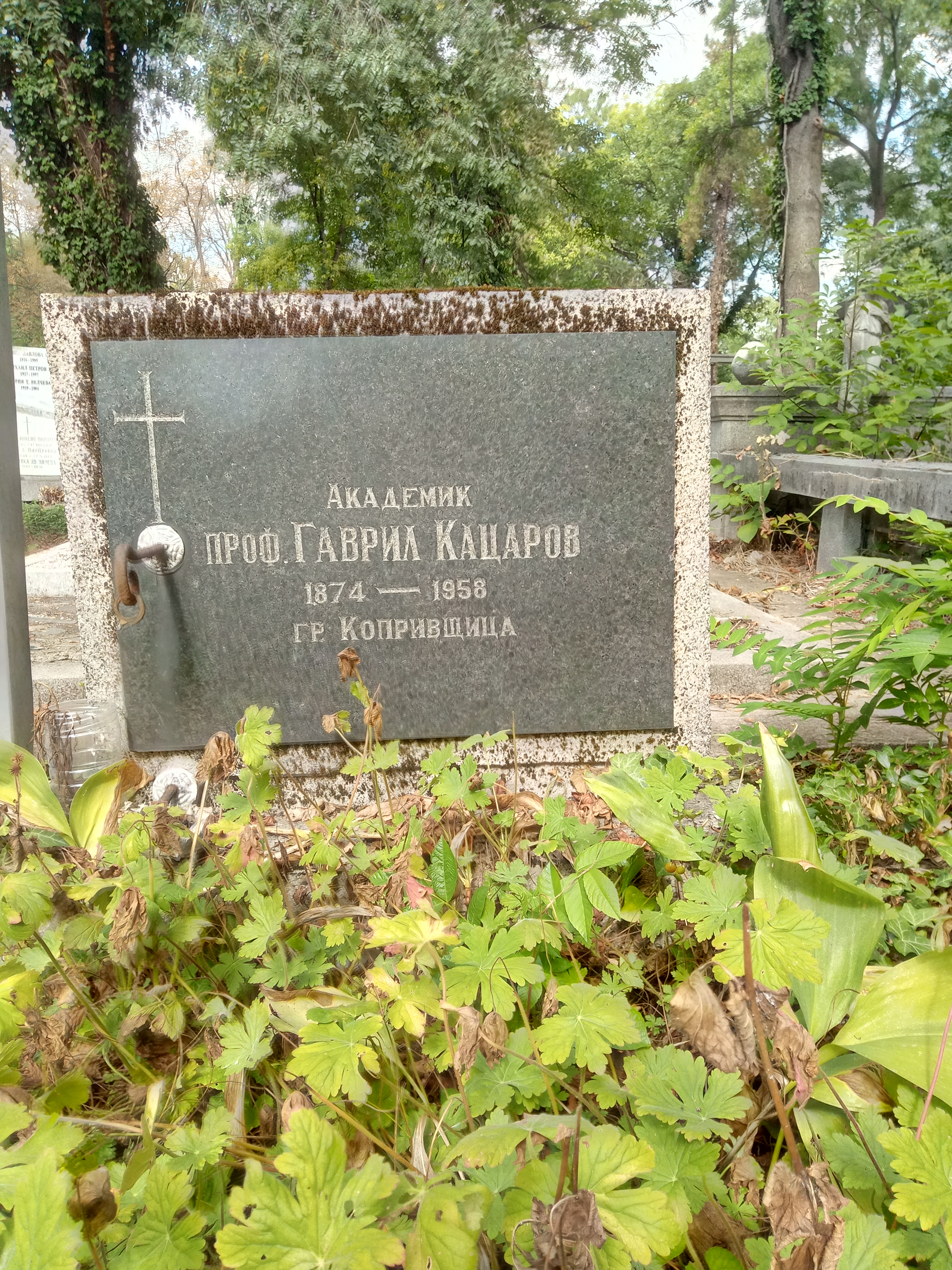
Gavril Katzarov's grave at Sofia Central Cemetery (42°42′44.1″N 23°20′04.7″E)

== External Sources ==
- Works by Gavril Katsarov in libraries (WorldCat Catalog).
