= Dacology =

Scientific study of Dacia

Dacology (Romanian: Dacologie) is a branch of Thracology which focuses on the scientific study of Dacia and Dacian antiquities and is a regional and thematic branch of the larger disciplines of ancient history and archaeology. A practitioner of the discipline is a Dacologist. Dacology investigates the range of ancient Dacian culture (language, literature, history, religion, art, economics, and ethics) from c. 1000 BC up to the end of Roman rule in the 4th-7th centuries. It is directly subordinated to Thracology, since Dacians are considered a branch of the Thracians by most mainstream research and historical sources. Other theories sustain that the Daco-Thracian relation is not as strong as originally thought and as such Dacology has the potential to evolve as an independent discipline from Thracology.

== History ==
One of the first mentions of the term Dacology was made by the historian Radu Vulpe at the 2nd International Congress of Thracology in September 1976 in connection with the Romanian historians Bogdan Petriceicu Hasdeu and Ion I. Russu. The Romanian Thracology Institute I.G Bibicescu, part of Romanian Academy, was founded in Bucharest in the same year. One of his first directors was the thracologist Dumitru Berciu (1907–1998).

The related term Thraco-Dacology also exists, alluding to Thraco-Dacian, and one of the first uses is also from around 1980, in the Romanian government archive.

The term Dacologist has been negatively affected by the association with protochronism. Some researchers prefer to call themselves Thracologists instead of Dacologists. This choice of title is made in the context of their research being focused on the Dacians and without necessarily promoting a strong connection between the Thracians and Dacians.

== Dacologists ==
Researchers who have been noted in the field of Dacology include:

- Bogdan Petriceicu Hasdeu
- Ion I. Russu
- Radu Vulpe
- Andrei Vartic

== International Congress of Dacology ==
There have been 11 editions of the International Congress of Dacology organized so far. However, they have been organized by the controversial Dacianist group around Napoleon Săvescu, thus making the term Dacology synonymous with Protochronism in this ambiance.

== See also ==
- Dacia
- Thracology
- Dacian language
- Thracian language

== Bibliography ==
- Olteanu, Sorin. "Linguae Thraco-Daco-Moesorum" (in Romanian and English). Archived from the original on 9 March 2008.
- Vulpe, Radu (1980). Actes du IIe Congrès international de thracologie: Linguistique, ethnologie (ethnographie, folkloristique et art populaire), anthropologie (in Romanian, English, and French). Bucharest: Editura Academiei.
- "Dacia: Revue d'archéologie et d'histoire ancienne". Dacia, Revue d'Archéologie et d'Histoire Ancienne (in English and French). 10. București, Romania: Institutul de Arheologie. 2005. ISSN 0070-251X.
- "Revista arhivelor". Revista arhivelor. 42. Romania: Arhivele Statului. 1980.
- "Dacia: revue d'archéologie et d'histoire ancienne". Sc (in Romanian). 34 (3–6). București, Romania: Academia Română. 1983.
