= Hansca =

- Commune and village
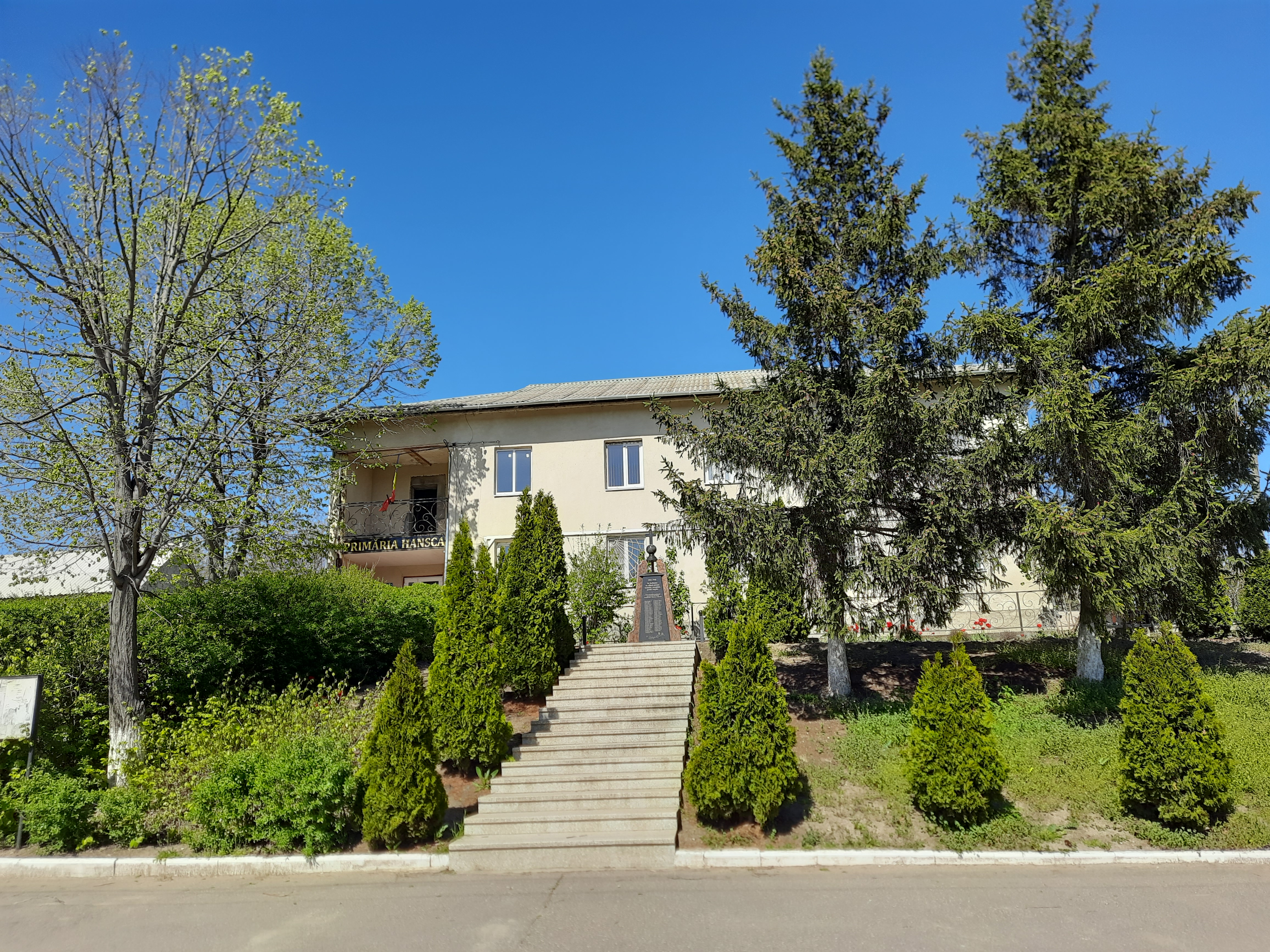

- Location in Moldova
- Coordinates: 46°49′4″N 28°45′8″E
- Country: Moldova
- County: Ialoveni
- Elevation: 144 m (472 ft)

Population (2014 census)
  - Total: 1,092
- Time zone: UTC+2 (EET)
  - Summer (DST): UTC+3 (EEST)

Hansca is a village in Ialoveni District, Moldova.

== Demographics ==
According to the 2004 census, the village population is 1080 people, 49.91% are male and 50.09% female.

Nationality	Residents	% of Population
Moldovan	1078	99.81
Russian	1	0.09
Other	1	0.09
Total	1080	100%
