= Margarita Tacheva =

Bulgarian historian (1936–2008)

Margarita Tacheva (Bulgarian: Маргарита Тачева; June 4, 1936 – December 18, 2008) was an eminent Bulgarian historian, a full professor in ancient history and Thracology.

== Selected publications ==
- Tacheva, Margarita (2006). Царете на Древна Тракия [Kings of ancient Thrace] (in Bulgarian). Vol. 1. Sofii︠a: Agato. ISBN 978-954-8761-73-4.
- Tacheva, Margarita (1997). История на българските земи в древността през елинистическата и римската епоха [Ancient history of the Bulgarian lands in Hellenistic and Roman times] (in Bulgarian). Sofia University. ISBN 9789540710327.
- Tacheva, Margarita (1983). Eastern Cults in Moesia Inferior and Thracia: (5th Century BC-4th Century AD). Brill Archive. ISBN 90-04-06884-8.
