= Sycaeboae =

Sycaeboae (Greek: "Συκαιβόαι") is the name of a Thracian tribe, which was mentioned by Polyaenus.

== See also ==
- List of Thracian tribes
