= Cebrenii =

Thracian tribe

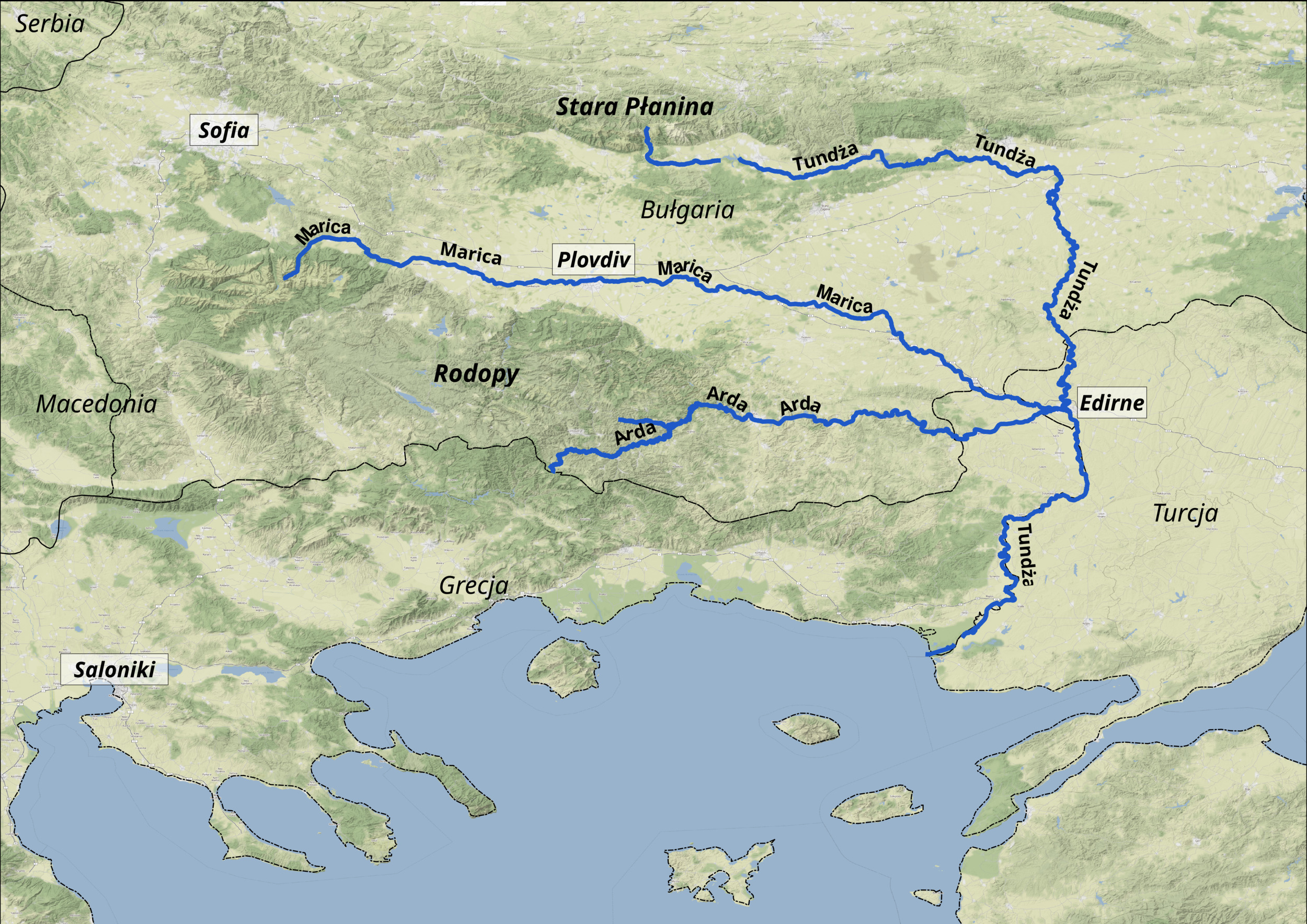
Arisbus river where the Cebrenii lived, is an unlocated tributary of Hebros river, known today as Maritsa

Cebrenii (Greek: Κεβρήνιοι) was a Thracian tribe that lived around the Arisbus river in Thrace. They are mentioned by Polyaenus and Strabo. It can be presumed that some of the Cebrenii migrated alongside other Thracian tribes during the migration waves to Anatolia and settled the region of Cebrenia in Troad establishing Cebrene.

Strabo notes in ''Geography'' that certain people and place names in Thrace had the same names as those in the Troad:

...There is a river Arisbus in Thrace, as we have said before, near which are situated the Cabrenii Thracians. There are many names common to Thracians and Trojans, as Scaei, a Thracian tribe, a river Scaeus, a Scaean wall, and in Troy, Scaean gates. There are Thracians called Xanthii, and a river Xanthus in Troja; an Arisbus which discharges itself into the Hebrus, and an Arisbe in Troja; a river Rhesus in Troja, and Rhesus, a king of the Thracians.

== See also ==
- List of Thracian tribes
