= Bucur =

Bucur may refer to:

- Bucur (legendary shepherd), the legendary founder of Romania's capital, București (Bucharest)
- Bucur (surname)
- Bârsa lui Bucur River, a tributary of the Bârsa River in Romania
- Bucur River, a river in northwestern Romania
- Bucur Church, a church which formerly served as the chapel for the Radu Voda Monastery in Bucharest
