= Thraco-Illyrian languages =

Linguistical theory

Thraco-Illyrian
- (proposed)
- Geographic distribution: Balkans
- Linguistic classification: Indo-European: Thraco-Illyrian
- Proto-language: Proto-Thraco-Illyrian
- Subdivisions: Daco-Thracian; Illyrian

Language codes

The term Thraco-Illyrian refers to a hypothesis according to which the Daco-Thracian and Illyrian languages comprise a distinct branch of Indo-European. Thraco-Illyrian is also used as a term merely implying a Thracian-Illyrian interference, mixture or sprachbund, or as a shorthand way of saying that it is not determined whether a subject is to be considered as pertaining to Thracian or Illyrian. Downgraded to a geo-linguistic concept, these languages are referred to as Paleo-Balkan.

== Linguistic contact and similarity ==
The Vardar, South Morava and Great Morava rivers are generally considered to approximate the border between the Illyrian and Thracian spheres, in the west and east respectively. However, Thracian and Illyrian did not have a clear-cut frontier. There was also, clearly, significant interaction between the Illyrian and Thracian spheres, with some Thracian groups occupying the Illyrian sphere and vice versa; the identity of some groups as Illyrian or Thracian has also remained unclear, or, in some instances, a Thraco-Illyrian mix has been proposed. Such factors reinforce the impression that many similarities between the Illyrian and Thracian lexes resulted from language contact.

Other scholars, such as Romanian linguist and historian Ion Russu, argue that there were major similarities between Illyrian and Thracian and so a shared, ancestral linguistic branch is probable, rather than them forming a sprachbund. Among the Thraco-Illyrian correspondences noted by I. I. Russu are the following:

Illyrian	Daco-Thracian	Remarks
Abroi	Abre-	Abre- is an element taken from certain Thracian anthroponyms
Aploi, Aplus, Apulia	Apuli, Appulus, Apulum	
Bilia, Bilios	Bila	
Dardi, Dardani	Dardanos, Darda-para	
Saprinus	Sapri-sara	
Separi	Sapaioi	
Sita	Sita, Seita	
Tribulium	Triballi, Tribanta	
Zorada	Zar-, Zur-	

Not many Thraco-Illyrian correspondences are definite, and a number may be incorrect, even from the list above. Sorin Paliga (2002) however states: "According to the available data, we may surmise that Thracian and Illyrian were mutually understandable, e.g. like Czech and Slovak, in one extreme, or like Spanish and Portuguese, at the other."

Other linguists however argue that Illyrian and Thracian were different Indo-European branches which later converged through contact. It is also of significance that Illyrian languages still have not been classified whether they were centum or satem language, while it is undisputed that Thracian was a satem language by the Classical Period (the satem nature of proto-Thracian is disputed, Olteanu 2002).

Due to the fragmentary attestation of both Illyrian and Thraco-Dacian, the existence of a Thraco-Illyrian branch remains controversial. Evidence of a Thraco-Illyrian branch has also been sought in the Albanian language, which has been claimed to have developed from either an Illyrian language with Thraco-Dacian influences or a Thraco-Dacian language with Illyrian influences. However, the arguments for such claims tend to be circular: for example, the kinship of the Albanian with the Thracian is affirmed by attributing Albanian traits to the Thracian.

Due to the paucity of written evidence, what can be said with certainty in current research is that on the one hand a significant group of shared Indo-European non-Romance cognates between Albanian and Romanian indicates at least contact with the 'Daco-Thraco-Moesian complex', and that on the other hand there is some evidence to argue that Albanian is descended from the 'Illyrian complex'. On the basis of shared features and innovations, Albanian is grouped together with Messapic in the same branch in the current phylogenetic classification of the Indo-European language family, called 'Albanoid' or 'Illyric'.

== Politicized and discarded theories ==
After the 1960s, some linguists argued in Bulgarian and Soviet journals that no strong evidence for Thraco-Illyrian exists, and that the two language-areas show more differences than correspondences (Vladimir Georgiev, Ivan Duridanov, Eric Hamp, et al.). However, it was pointed out that such onomastic studies were carried out through pan-Thracian and pan-Illyrian approaches, which are considered outdated and not objective in current historical linguistics.

== See also ==
- Albanian language
- Balkan sprachbund
- Classification of Thracian
- Dacian language
- Paleo-Balkan languages
- Romanian words of possible Dacian origin (and comparison with Albanian words)
- Albanian–Romanian linguistic relationship
- Thracian language
- Venetic language

== Notes ==
- Linguists do not recognize the Paeonian as separate from the Illyrian or Thracian languages.

The Ancient Macedonian is similarly undetermined. Paliga (2002) states: "It is therefore difficult to say whether the ancient Macedonians spoke an idiom closer to Thracian, Illyrian, Greek or a specific idiom."

== Bibliography ==
- Georgiev, Vladimir.
- Paliga, Sorin. Pre-Slavic place-names. 2002.
- Russu, Ion I. (1969). Limba traco-dacilor (in Romanian). Bucharest: Editura Stiintifica.
- Wilkes, J. J. (1992). The Illyrians. Blackwell. ISBN 06-3119-807-5.
