= Bucur (legendary shepherd) =

Legendary founder of Romania's capital, Bucureşti

Bucur is the legendary Romanian shepherd who is said to have founded Bucharest, giving it his name. While the legend about the shepherd is probably apocryphal, the name of the city (Romanian: București) is actually quite likely derived from a person named Bucur, as the suffix -ești is used for settlements derived from personal names, usually of the owner of the land or of the founder, though it is more likely that Bucur was the noble who owned the land.

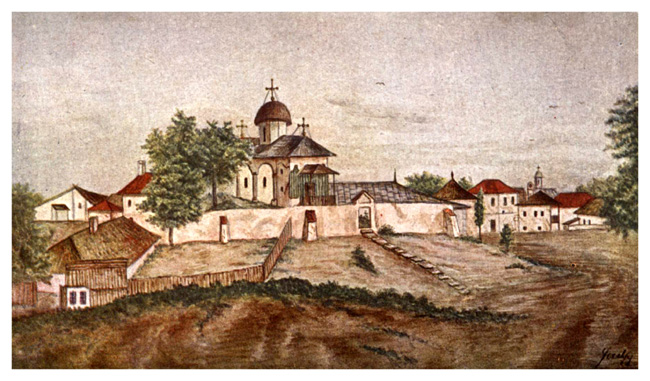
An 1856 painting of the Church of Bucur

There is an old small church named Biserica lui Bucur ("Bucur's Church") which, as the legend goes, was built by Bucur himself. However, this is not true, since the church appears to have been built at the beginning of the 18th century, and the oldest archeological remains found in the surrounding area were from the second half of the 16th century.

The earliest reference to Bucur was written by the Franciscan friar Blasius Kleiner, who claimed that Bucur was both a shepherd and a haiduc. Another early reference is found in An Account of the Principalities of Wallachia and Moldavia, an 1820 book published in London by the English consul in Bucharest, William Wilkinson. The earliest reference to Bucur's Church is from a geography manual written by Iosif Gentilie in 1835.

As claimed by I. Fr. Sulzer in 1781, the name Bucur is probably related with Romanian bucurie ("joy"), bucuros ("joyful"), and a bucura ("to become joyful"), having a cognate in Albanian, bukur ("beautiful"), and it is believed to be of Dacian origin.

There are various other etymologies given by early scholars for the city name, including the one of Ottoman traveler Evliya Çelebi, who said Bucharest is named after a certain Abu-Kariş, from the tribe of Bani-Kureiș, and that of an early 19th-century book published in Vienna, where it is assumed its name is derived from Bukovie, a beech forest.

== See also ==
- Founding of Bucharest
- Etymology of Bucharest
- List of Romanian words of possible Dacian origin
