= Romanian lexis =

Provenance of the words of the Romanian language

The lexis of the Romanian language (or Daco-Romanian), a Romance language, has changed over the centuries as the language evolved from Vulgar Latin, to Common Romanian, to medieval, modern and contemporary Romanian. A large proportion (about 42%) of present-day Romanian lexis is not inherited from Latin and in some semantic areas loanwords far outnumber inherited ones making Romanian an example of a language with a high degree of lexical permeability.

== Thraco-Dacian substrate ==
Romanian has around 90 words from Thraco-Dacian.

abur, argea, baci, balaur, bală, balegă, baltă, barză, bască, bâlc, bâr, brad, brânză, brâu, brusture, buc, bucur, bunget, buză, căciulă, călbează, căpușă, cătun, ceafă, cioară, cioc, ciucă, ciuf, ciump, ciupi, ciut, coacăză, copac, copil, curpen, cursă, droaie, druete, fărâmă, fluier, gard, gata, ghimpe, ghionoaie, ghiuj, grapă, gresie, groapă, grumaz, grunz, gușă, jumătate, lete, leurdă, mal, mare, mazăre, măgar, măgură, mărar, mânz, moș, mugur, murg, mușcoi, năpârcă, noian, pârâu, pupăză, rață, rânză, sarbăd, scăpăra, scrum, sâmbure, spânz, strepede, strugure, strungă, șopârlă, știră, țap, țarc, țeapă, urdă, vatră, viezure, vizuină, zară, zgardă.

== Latin ==
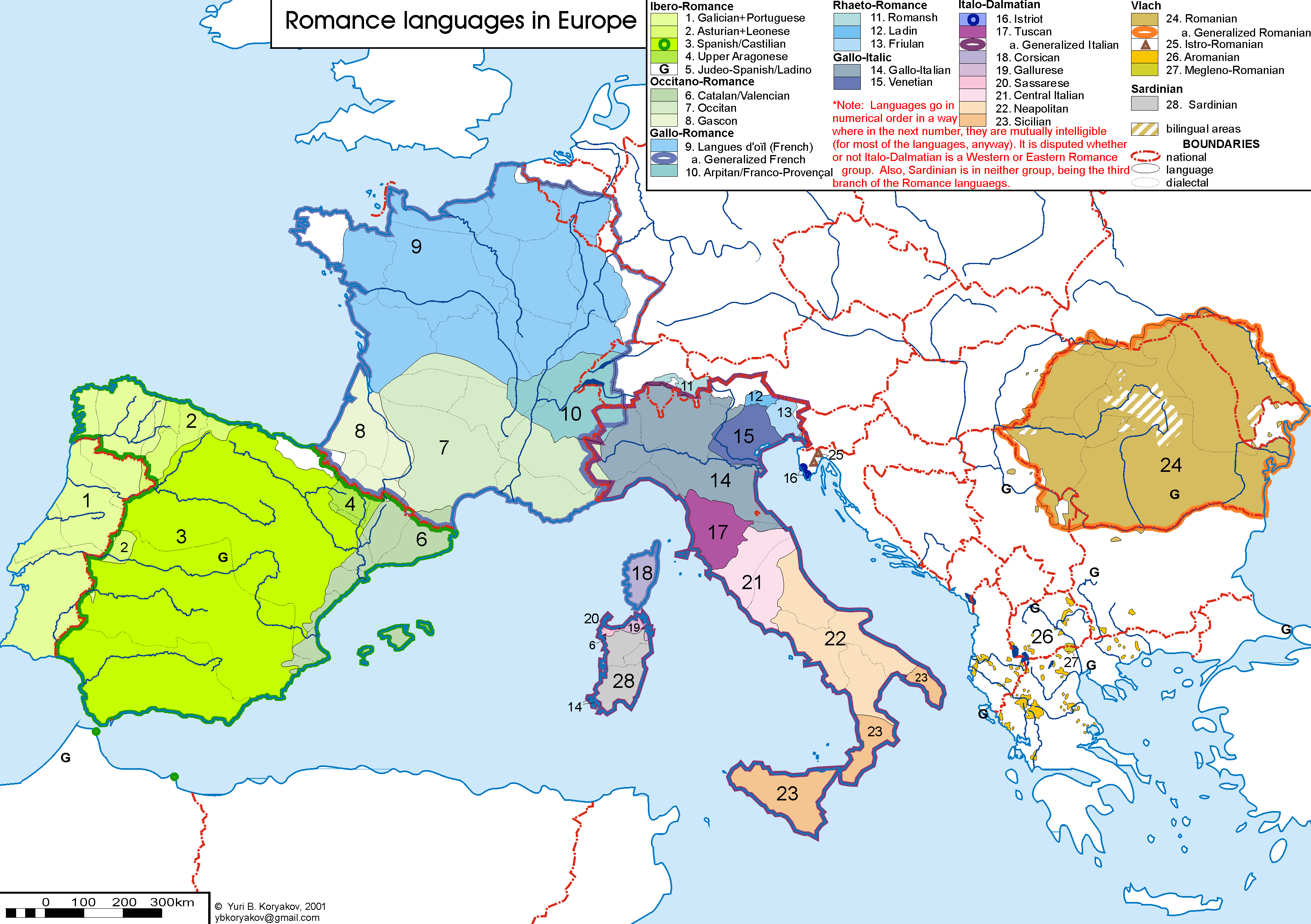
Current distribution of Romance Languages in Europe

Romanian has inherited about 2000 Latin words through Vulgar Latin, sometimes referred to as Danubian Latin in this context, that form the essential part of the lexis and without them communication would not be possible. 500 of these words are found in all other Romance languages, and they include prepositions and conjunctions (ex: cu, de, pe, spre), numerals (ex: unu, doi, trei), pronouns (ex: eu, tu, noi, voi), adjectives, adverbs and verbs with multiple meanings (ex: bun, dulce, foarte, avea, veni). Complete phrases can be built using only inherited Latin words.

Of the remaining words some are common to Romanian and only one other Romance language, such as înțelege "to understand" also found in Romansh (Lat. intelligere), trece "to pass" found in Occitan (Lat. traicere), or sui "to climb up" found in Old Spanish (Lat. subire), and around 100 of these words are not found in any other Romance languages. Some examples of the latter are:

adăpost, ager, agest, apuca, armar, asuda, așterne, cântec, ceață, cerceta, creștin, dezmierda, feri, ferice, flămând, ierta, întâi, județ, lânced, lângoare, legăna, leșina, lingură, mărgea, negustor, oaie, ospăț, plăcintă, plăsa, plimba, purcede, puroi, putred, sănătoare (sunătoare), suoară (subsoară), treaptă, trepăda, urca, vânăt, vătăma, veșted, urî.

Of the words preserved in other Romance languages some have not only changed their shape, but also their meaning during their evolution from Latin to Romanian. Such are:

- bărbat "man" (< Latin barbātus "bearded")
- ceață "fog" (< Latin caecia "blindness")
- femeie "woman" (< Latin familia "people belonging to a household")
- inimă "heart" (< Latin anima "soul")
- soț and soție "husband" and "wife" (< Latin socius "fellow")

== Pre-Modern loanwords ==
=== Slavic loanwords ===
(see also Slavic influence on Romanian)

Contact with Slavic languages has brought numerous loanwords (about 15% of the current lexis) that permeated all the semantic fields of the language. It also brought prefixes (ne-, pre-, răs-) and suffixes (-an,-eț, -iște), introduced new sounds (for example j like in jar from Old Church Slavonic žarŭ), calques (limbă with initial meaning of tongue, language gained the additional sense of people, after Old Church Slavonic językŭ- tongue, language, people) adverbs and interjections (da, ba, iată). The influence of the Slavic languages on Romanian forms the adstratum of the language.

Among the basic Slavic loanwords are:

ceas clock, citi to read, covaci blacksmith, crai king, curvă whore, da yes, drag dear, dragoste love, duh spirit, ghost, haină shirt, iubi to love, izvor source, mândru proud, muncă work, noroc luck, opri stop, porni start, praf dust, prieten friend, prost stupid; simple, rând row; order, sărac poor, sfânt holy, sfert quarter slănină bacon, smântână sour cream, sută hundred, târg market, tigaie pan, trup body, veac century, vreme weather; time, zid wall.

Slavic languages also mediated the entry of Medieval Greek words in the language. Out of 278 words of Greek origin before 15th century 2 were borrowed through Medieval Latin, 22 directly, and 254 through South Slavic languages. Slavic loanwords represent about 9% of the basic vocabulary.

=== Greek loanwords ===
From the Latin spoken in the Danube area, Romanian has inherited a number of words from Ancient Greek that did not get transmitted in other Romance languages, for example: cir, ciumă, frică, jur, papură, părângă, plai, spân, sterp, stup.

From Medieval Greek words like folos, lipsi, părăsi, prisos, sosi entered the language.

During the Phanariot Period, Romanian, in particular the southern subdialects, borrowed numerous words like argat, crivăț, chivernisi that have since gone out of use, while others, like stafidă for example, have remained part of the vocabulary. According to linguist László Gáldi only about 10% of the words loaned during this period remained in use in the language.

Some of the Greek words in Romanian can be recognise by the -isi (-asi, -esi, -osi, -arisi) (ex: chivernisi, fandosi), -os, -icos (plicticos, politicos), -adă, or -ache (in particular with names for example Costache, Manolache).

=== Hungarian loanwords ===
Hungarian loanwords are notably absent from the other 3 Eastern Romance languages.

Words of Hungarian origin have entered the basic vocabulary and represent 1.27% of this category.

Some examples of Hungarian loanwords in Romanian are:

- acaț "black locust" (from Hungarian akác)
- ademeni "to lure, to seduce" (from Hungarian adomány)
- alcătui "to create, to form, to make" (from Hungarian alkotni)
- altoi "to graft" (from Hungarian oltani)
- belșug "abundance" (from Hungarian bőség)
- birui "to overcome, to subdue" (from Hungarian bírni)
- bănui "to suspect" (from Hungarian bánni)
- bântui "to haunt" (from Hungarian bántani)
- cheltui "to spend" (from Hungarian költeni)
- chin "pain" (from Hungarian kín)
- chip "face, image" (from Hungarian kép)
- ciopor "group" (from Hungarian csoport)
- covaci "blacksmith" (from Hungarian kovács)
- dâmb "small hill" (from Hungarian domb)
- făgădui "to promise, to pledge" (from Hungarian fogadni)
- gând "thought, care" (from Hungarian gond)
- hotar "border" (from Hungarian határ)
- ic "wedge" (from Hungarian ék)
- iobag "serf" (from Hungarian jobbágy)
- jale "sage" (from Hungarian zsálya)
- fel "sort, type, kind" (from Hungarian féle)
- labă "palm, paw" (from Hungarian láb)
- lacăt "padlock" (from Hungarian lakat)
- locui "to dwell" (from Hungarian lakni)
- mai "liver" (from Hungarian máj)
- marfă "goods" (from Hungarian marha)
- neam "family, kin, ancestry, nation" (from Hungarian nem)
- nemeș "landowner" (from Hungarian nemes)
- oraș "city" (from Hungarian város)
- pa "bye" (from Hungarian pá , but it could also be from German pa)
- panglică "ribbon, hatband" (from Hungarian pántlika)
- seamă "account" (from Hungarian szám)
- sicriu "coffin" (from Hungarian szekrény)
- sobă "room" (from Hungarian szoba)
- șoim "falcon" (from Hungarian sólyom)
- șuvoi "stream, current, torrent" (from Hungarian sió)
- tobă "drum" (from Hungarian dob)
- tobă "holder, case" (from Hungarian tok)
- uliu "buzzard, goshawk" (from Hungarian ölyv)
- vaida "voivode" (from Hungarian vajda)
- vamă "custom, toll" (from Hungarian vám)
- zăbală "bit (for a horse)" (from Hungarian zabola)

Food and beverage words of Hungarian origin:

- doboș "dobos" (from Hungarian dobos)
- gulaș "goulash" (from Hungarian gulyás)
- pălincă "palinka" (from Hungarian pálinka)
- papricaș "paprika stew" (from Hungarian paprikás)

=== Turkish loanwords ===
Large parts of modern-day Romania were under Ottoman suzerainty for several centuries. As a result, exchanges in language, food and culture occurred, and Romanian has absorbed several loanwords of Turkish origin. Even though Turkish language had an influence on the Romanian language, only a few loanwords remain used today on a daily basis. Dobrogea region was part of Rumelia for centuries, as a result there exists a Turkish community there. Ada Kaleh was a small island located in Banat region on Danube river that was inhabited entirely by Turkish people from all parts of the Ottoman Empire who mostly produced Turkish goods for the region.

Examples of Turkish loanwords in Romanian language are:

- aba "a type of garment" (< Turkish aba)
- abanos "ebony" (< Turkish abanoz)
- abitir "more" (< Turkish beter "worse")
- aga "military officer" (< Turkish ağa "landlord, chief, master")
- alai "group of people" (< Turkish alay)
- arnăut "mercenary" (< Turkish arnavud)
- arpagic "chive" (< Turkish arpacık)
- arșic "bone of the leg joint" (< Turkish așık)
- bacșiș "tip, gratuity" (< Turkish bahşiş)
- basma "kerchief" (< Turkish basma)
- batal "wether" (< Turkish batal, "useless" [archaic])
- băbalac "old early" (< Turkish babalık)
- băcan "merchant" (< Turkish bakkal "grocery store")
- bairam "big party" (< Turkish bayram "celebrative day")
- baltag "ax" (< Turkish balta)
- barbut "gambling" (< Turkish barbut, a type of gambling game referred as craps in English)
- bașca "different" (< Turkish başka)
- basma "handkerchief" (< Turkish basma)
- beci "cellar" (< Turkish beç [obscure])
- bei "governor" (< Turkish bey)
- belea "misfortune" (< Turkish bela)
- beizadea "son of gentle" (< Turkish beyzade)
- boi "to paint" (< Turkish boya)
- bre "hey" (< Turkish bre)
- briceag "pocket knife" (< Turkish bıçak)
- buluc "pile" (< Turkish bölük "division")
- burghiu "drill" (< Turkish burgu)
- bursuc "badger" (< Turkish porsuk)
- buzdugan "iron rod" (< Turkish bozdoğan)
- cabazlâc "joke" (< Turkish kabazlık)
- cacealma "trick" (< Turkish kaçırma)
- cadână "lady" (< Turkish kadın "woman")
- calcană "turbot" (< Turkish kalkan balığı)
- caldarâm "pavement" (< Turkish kaldırım)
- cântar "weighing" (< Turkish kantar)
- capcană "trap" (< Turkish kapkan, a variation of kapan)
- caraghios "funny" (< Turkish Karagöz)
- cat "storey" (< Turkish kat)
- capac "cork" (< Turkish kapak "lid")
- cazan "metal" (< Turkish kazan "cauldron")
- cearșaf "sheet" (< Turkish çarşaf)
- chef "big party" (< Turkish keyif)
- cherem "stay" (<Turkisk kerem)
- chiabur "rich peasant" (< Turkish kibār)
- chibrit "lighter" (< Turkish kibrit "match")
- chioșc "kiosk" (< Turkish köşk)
- chior "sees with one eye" (< Turkish kör "blind")
- ciob "fragment" (< Turkish çöp "trash")
- cioban "shepard" (< Turkish çoban)
- ciorapi "socks" (< Turkish çorap)
- cișmea "installation" (< Turkish çeşme "fountain")
- ciubuc "beading" (< Turkish çubuk "stick")
- cizmă "boot" (< Turkish çizme)
- colan "girdle" (< Turkish kolan)
- covată "trough" (< Turkish kuvata)
- cusur "defective" (< Turkish kusur "defect")
- cutie "box" (< Turkish kutu)
- dulap "wardrobe" (< Turkish dolap)
- dovleac "pumpkin" (< Turkish dövlek)
- dugheană "impoverished" (< Turkish dükkân)
- dușman "enemy" (< Turkish düşman)
- dușumea "flooring" (< Turkish döşeme)
- făraș "shovel" (< Turkish faraş)
- farfurie "plate" (< Turkish farfuri)
- felinar "lantern" (< Turkish fener)
- fes "fez" (< Turkish fes)
- fildeș "tusk" (< Turkish fildişi)
- fitil "suppository" (< Turkish fitil)
- furtun "hose" (< Turkish hortum)
- geantă "smaller bag" (< Turkish çanta)
- geam "window" (< Turkish cam)
- get-beget "from ancestor to ancestor" (< Turkish ğedd bi ğedd)
- ghiveci "pot" (< Turkish güvec)
- habar "idea" (< Turkish haber "news")
- haide/hai "come on" (< Turkish haydi)
- haiduc "hajduk" (< Turkish haydut)
- haimana "stray" (< Turkish haymana)
- hal "bad condition" (< Turkish hâl "state, situation")
- hamal "carrier, portet" (< Turkish hammal)
- hamam "bath" (< Turkish hamam)
- harem "the cauldrons" (< Turkish harem)
- hașiș "hashish" (< Turkish haşiş)
- hatâr "service" (< Turkish hatır)
- hazna "reservoir" (< Turkish hazne)
- ibric "ibrik" (< Turkish ibrik)
- imam "reciter in prayer" (< Turkish imam)
- iorgovan "lilac" (< Turkish erguvan)
- iureș "impetuous" (< Turkish yürügüş)
- lighean "basin" (< Turkish liğen)
- macara "crane" (< Turkish makara)
- mahmur "sleepy" (< Turkish mahmur)
- maimuță "monkey" (< Turkish maymun)
- moft "whim" (< Turkish müft)
- moșmodi "slow" (< Turkish muşmula)
- murdar "dirty" (< Turkish murdar)
- musafir "guest" (< Turkish misāfir)
- mușteriu "client" (< Turkish müşteri)
- năframă "cloth" (< Turkish mahrama)
- nai "flute" (< Turkish ney)
- narghilea "hookah" (< Turkish nargile)
- nur "glory" (< Turkish nur "light")
- oca "unit of measure" (< Turkish okka)
- pafta "threader" (< Turkish pafta)
- pașă "high titled" (< Turkish paşa)
- pașalâc "despotic rule" (< Turkish paşalik)
- patalama "diploma" (< Turkish batalama)
- perdea "curtain" (< Turkish perde)
- sadea "pure" (< Turkish sade "plain")
- șah "chess" (< Turkish şah "king (chess)")
- șal "shawl" (< Turkish şal)
- șerbet "sherbet" (< Turkish şerbet)
- sictir "trivial swearing (< Turkish siktir)
- șiret "profiter" (< Turkish şirret)
- sultan "ruler" (< Turkish sultan)
- suliman "herbaceous plant" (< Turkish sülümen)
- surghiuni "exile" (< Turkish sürgün)
- tabiet "pleasure" (< Turkish tabiat "nature")
- tacâm "set" (< Turkish takım)
- tacla "conversation" (< Turkish takla)
- tain "provision" (< Turkish tayin)
- talaș "sawdust" (< Turkish talaş)
- tarabă "type of table" (< Turkish tarab)
- taraf "party" (< Turkish taraf)
- taman "complete" (< Turkish tamam)
- tavă "plate" (< Turkish tava)
- tavan "ceiling" (< Turkish tavan)
- tembel "idiot" (< Turkish tembel "lazy")
- tertip "arrangement" (< Turkish tertip)
- teșcherea "memorandum" (< Turkish tezkere)
- tevatură "loud" (< Turkish tevatür)
- tichie "skullcap" (< Turkish takke)
- tinichea "tin" (< Turkish teneke)
- tipsie "tray" (< Turkish tepsi)
- tiptil "slowly" (< Turkish tebdil)
- tizic "prismatic cake" (< Turkish tezek "manure")
- toi "banquet" (< Turkish toy)
- tuci "cast iron" (< Turkish tuç)
- tutun "tobacco" (< Turkish tütün)
- ursuz "sinister" (< Turkish uğursuz)
- vizir "minister" (< Turkish vezir)
- zaiafet "party" (< Turkish ziyāfet "feast")
- zar "dice" (< Turkish zar)
- zaraf "moneychanger" (< Turkish sarraf)
- zeflemea "kidding" (< Turkish zevklenmek)
- zor "hurry" (< Turkish zor)

Food and beverage loanwords of Turkish origin:

- airan "doogh" (< Turkish ayran)
- baclava "baclava" (< Turkish baklava)
- cafea "coffee" (< Turkish kahve)
- caimac "cream" (< Turkish kaymak)
- caisă "apricot" (< Turkish kayısı)
- cașcaval "cheese" (< Turkish kaşkaval)
- cataif "knafeh" (< Turkish künefe)
- ceai "tea" (< Turkish çay)
- covrig "simit" (< Turkish gevrek)
- chefir "kefir" (< Turkish kefír)
- chiftea "meatballs" (< Turkish köfte)
- ciorbă "chorba" (< Turkish çorba)
- dolma "dolma" (< Turkish dolma)
- halva "sweet" (< Turkish halva)
- iaurt "yogurt" (< Turkish yoğurt)
- musaca "moussaka (< Turkish musakka)
- pilaf "pilaf" (< Turkish pilav)
- rachiu/rachie "fruit spirit" (< Turkish rakı)
- rahat "turkish delight (< Turkish rahat lokkum)
- sarmale "cabbage rolls" (< Turkish sarma)
- șofran "saffron" (< Turkish şafran)
- susan "sesame" (< Turkish susam)
- telemea "telemea" (< Turkish teleme)
- tulumbă "tulumba" (< Turkish tulumba)

Many Ottoman and Phanariot Greek words have acquired pejorative meanings compared with their original meaning:

- Turkish çubuk ("stick") became ciubuc ("the tube of a hookah") and now is "bribe", since, like a pipe, it is offered to ease a deal.
- Ottoman خزینه, hazine ("treasure, treasure chamber") became hazna ("septic tank, latrine").
- Phanariot Greek πρα(γ)ματεία, pra(gh)matia ("practical-minded man") became pramatie ("immoral person"). Its cognate pragmatic from French pragmatique has maintained a neutral meaning.
- Arabic رَاحَة الْحُلْقُوم, rāḥa(t) al-ḥulqūm ("throat comfort"), through Turkish rahat lokum ("Turkish delights") became Romanian rahat ("shit").

=== German loanwords ===
Less numerous, German loanwords first entered the language with the contact with Saxons colonists. Words like turn - tower referring to medieval architecture, but also șanț; joagăr, buștean, șindrilă, leaț, șopron, șură from the field of woodwork were then joined by others such as cartof, bere, șurub, șvaițer, șpriț, and șnițel.

== Modern Romanian ==
Romanian dialect, called Daco-Romanian in specialty literature to distinguish it from the other dialects of Common Romanian, inherited from Latin about 2000 words (a similar number to other Romance languages), a relatively small number compared to its modern lexis of 150000. In the 19th century, as the Romanian society transitioned from rural and agricultural towards urban and industrial, the lexis underwent a vigorous enrichment with loanwords from its Romance relatives, French and Italian. Many scholarly and technical terms were also imported from Neo-Latin. Some words, especially of Greek (arvună, ipochimen, simandicos) and Turkish (acadea, beizadea, hatâr) origin, fell into relative disuse or acquired an ironic connotation.

Among the words which entered the language:

- deja "already" (from French déjà)
- jena "disturb" (from French gener)
- medic "physician" (from Latin medicus)
- servi "serve" (from French or Italian)
- ziar "newspapers" (from Italian diario)

Romanian's core lexicon (2,581 words); Marius Sala, VRLR (1988)

A statistical analysis sorting Romanian words by etymological source carried out by Macrea (1961) based on the DLRM (49,649 words) showed the following makeup:

- 43% recent Romance loans (mainly French: 38.42%, Latin: 2.39%, Italian: 1.72%)
- 20% inherited Latin
- 11.5% Slavic (Old Church Slavonic: 7.98%, Bulgarian: 1.78%, Bulgarian-Serbian: 1.51%)
- 8.31% Unknown/unclear origin
- 3.62% Turkish
- 2.40% Modern Greek
- 2.17% Hungarian
- 1.77% German (including Austrian High German)
- 2.24% Onomatopoeic

Romanian has a lexical similarity of 77% with Italian, 75% with French, 74% with Sardinian, 73% with Catalan, 72% with Portuguese and Rheto-Romance, 71% with Spanish.

Romanian according to word origin
Romance and Latin	78%
Slavic	14%
Germanic (German-based influence, English loanwords)	2.54%
Greek	1.7%
Others	5.49%

Nowadays, the longest word in Romanian is pneumonoultramicroscopicsilicovolcaniconioză, with 44 letters, but the longest one admitted by the Dicționarul explicativ al limbii române ("Explanatory Dictionary of the Romanian Language", DEX) is electroglotospectrografie, with 25 letters.

== English loanwords ==
An increasing number of words from English entered the language in recent times. Among them are: interviu, miting, manager.

== See also ==
- Substrate in Romanian
- List of Romanian words of possible Dacian origin
- Romanian Academy
