= Classification of Thracian =

Attempts to classify the extinct Indo-European language

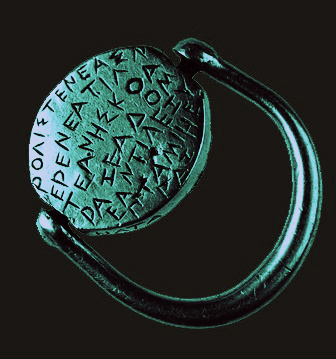
Golden ring (5th century BC) with inscription in Thracian: it reads (in the Greek alphabet) Rolisteneas erenea tiltean ēsko Arazea domean Tilezypta miē era zēlta, "I am Rolisteneas, a descendant of Nereneas; Tilezypta, an Arazian woman, delivered me to the ground."

The linguistic classification of the ancient Thracian language has long been a matter of contention and uncertainty, and there are widely varying hypotheses regarding its position among other Paleo-Balkan languages. It is not contested, however, that the Thracian languages were Indo-European languages which had acquired satem characteristics by the time they are attested.

== Hypothesized links ==
=== Thraco-Illyrian ===
"Thraco-Illyrian" is a hypothesis that posits a distinct Indo-European branch constituted by Thracian and Illyrian. "Thraco-Illyrian" is also used as a term merely implying a Thracian-Illyrian interference, mixture or sprachbund, or as a shorthand way of saying that it is not determined whether a subject is to be considered as pertaining to Thracian or Illyrian. The Thracian and Illyrian languages are placed among the Palaeo-Balkan languages, either through areal contact or genetic relationship. Due to the fragmentary attestation of both Illyrian and Thracian, the existence of a Thraco-Illyrian branch remains controversial.

The rivers Vardar and Morava are generally taken as the rough line of demarcation between the Illyrian sphere on the west and Thracian on the east, which overlapped in the eastern strip of Dardania. It appears that Thracian and Illyrian do not have a clear-cut frontier. Similarities found between the Illyrian and Thracian lects can thus be seen as merely linguistic interference.

I.I. Russu argue that there should have been major similarities between Illyrian and Thracian, and a common linguistic branch (not merely a Sprachbund) is probable. Among the Thraco-Illyrian correspondences Russu considers are the following:

Illyrian	Daco-Thracian	Remarks
Abroi	Abre-	Abre- is an element taken from certain Thracian anthroponyms
Aploi, Aplus, Apulia	Apuli, Appulus, Apulum	
Bilia, Bilios	Bila	
Dardi, Dardani	Dardanos, Darda-para	
Saprinus	Sapri-sara	
Separi	Sapaioi	
Sita	Sita, Seita	
Tribulium	Triballi, Tribanta	
Zorada	Zar-, Zur-	

Not many Thraco-Illyrian correspondences are definite, and a number may be incorrect, even from the list above. However, Sorin Paliga states: "According to the available data, we may surmise that Thracian and Illyrian were mutually understandable, e.g. like Czech and Slovak, in one extreme, or like Spanish and Portuguese, at the other." Other linguists argue that Illyrian and Thracian were different Indo-European branches which later converged through contact. It is also of significance that Illyrian languages still have not been classified whether they were centum or satem language, while it is undisputed that Thracian was a satem language by the Classical Period.

The linguistic hypothesis of a Thraco-Illyrian branch was seriously called into question in the 1960s. New publications argued that no strong evidence for Thraco-Illyrian exists, and that the two language-areas show more differences than correspondences. The place of Paeonian language remains unclear. Modern linguists are uncertain on the classification of Paeonian, due to the extreme scarcity of materials we have on this language. On one side are Wilhelm Tomaschek and Paul Kretschmer, who claim it belonged to the Illyrian family, and on the other side is Dimiter Dechev, who claims affinities with Thracian.

In 1977 Georgiev claimed that "Daco-Mysian" was closely related to the Thracian branch of Indo-European and that Illyrian was different from Thracian "as much as Iranian from Latin" for example.

==== Albanian ====
There are a number of close cognates between Thracian and Albanian, but this may indicate only that Thracian and Albanian are two Palaeo-Balkan languages related but not very closely related, belonging to their own branches of Indo-European, analogous to the situation between Albanian and the Baltic languages: Albanian and Baltic share many close cognates, while according to Mayer, Albanian is a descendant of Illyrian and escaped any heavy Baltic influence of Daco-Thracian.

The view of a close link between Albanian and Thracian has not gained wide acceptance among scholars and is rejected by most linguists, including Albanian ones, who mainly consider that Albanian belongs to the Illyrian branch of IE. On the basis of shared features and innovations, Albanian is grouped together with Messapic in the same branch in the current phylogenetic classification of the Indo-European language family. On the other hand, historical linguistic evidence shows that the individual phonetic history of Albanian and Thracian clearly indicates a very different sound development that cannot be considered as the result of the same language. A clear and remarkable isogloss that distinguishes Albanian from Thracian is the palatalization of the IE labiovelars which in Albanian was present well before Roman times, while the IE labiovelars clearly did not palatalize in the pre-Roman period in 'Thracian' or in the area where it was spoken.

=== Thraco-Phrygian or Thraco-Armenian hypothesis ===
For a long time a Thraco-Phrygian hypothesis grouping Thracian with the extinct Phrygian language was considered, largely based on Greek historians like Herodotus and Strabo. By extension of identifying Phrygians with Proto-Armenians, a Thraco-Phrygian branch of Indo-European was postulated with Thracian, Phrygian and Armenian and constituent languages. The evidence for this seems to have been mostly based on interpretations of history and identifying the eastern Mushki with Armenians and assuming they had branched off from western Mushki (whom have been conclusively identified as Phrygians). However, Frederik Kortlandt has argued, on linguistic grounds, such as a common treatment of Proto-Indo-European glottal stops, that Thracian can be considered a Proto-Armenian dialect, thus, the two languages forming a Thraco-Armenian branch of Indo-European. Kortlandt has also postulated a link between Thraco-Armenian and the hypothetical Graeco-Phrygian language family. Despite Thracian and Armenian being Satem languages and Greek and Phrygian being Centum languages, Kortlandt identifies sound correspondences and grammatical similarities, postulating a relationship between his Thraco-Armenian family and the more established Graeco-Phrygian family. Graeco-Armenian is by itself a common hypothesized subgrouping of Indo-European languages. Kortlandt groups Albanian with Dacian, considering Daco-Albanian as belonging to a separate language complex than Thraco-Armenian.

Older textbooks grouped Phrygian and Armenian with Thracian, but the belief is no longer popular and is mostly discarded. Today, Phrygian is not widely seen as linked to Thracian. Georgiev claimed that Thracian is different from Phrygian "as much as Greek from Albanian", comparing 150 Phrygian inscriptions. Duridanov found in 1976 Phrygian completely lacking parallels in Thracian and concluded that the Thraco-Phrygian theory is debunked. Duridanov argued that the Thraco-Illyrian theory is a mistake of the past: "In the past it was regarded that Thracian together with the Phrygian and other vanished languages belonged to the Iranian branch of the Indo-European languages. This mistake was corrected in the 80’s of the last century, but the ambiguities still persisted: the Thracian was combined in one group with the Phrygian (P. Kretschmer), and later – with the Illyrian (the language, spoken in the modern Dalmatia and Albania)."

=== Ancient Greek ===
Scholars have pointed out that the suffixes of the few surviving Thracian words have Greek linguistic features. Indeed, nearly all known Thracian personal names and toponyms are Greek. There are also many close cognates between Thracian and ancient Greek.

According to archaeologists Ioannis Liritzis and Gregory N. Tsokas, the Thracians spoke the Greek language with particular idioms, solecisms and barbarisms. Linguist Nikolaos P. Andriotes considered Thracian to be a sister language to ancient Greek. Historian Anna Avramea considered that the Thracian language was related to Greek as well, but that it was later alienated.

Sorin Mihai Olteanu, a Romanian linguist and Thracologist, proposed that the Thracian (as well as the Dacian) language was a centum language in its earlier period, and developed satem features over time. One of the arguments for this idea is that there are many close cognates between Thracian and Ancient Greek. There are also substratum words in the Romanian language that are cited as evidence of the genetic relationship of the Thracian language to ancient Greek. The Greek language itself may be grouped with the Phrygian language and Armenian language, both of which have been grouped with Thracian (see: Graeco-Phrygian, Graeco-Armenian and the section "Thraco-Phrygian or Thraco-Armenian hypothesis" above.

=== Daco-Thracian ===
A Daco-Thracian (or Thraco-Dacian) grouping with Dacian as either the same language or different from Thracian was widely held until the 1950s, but is untenable (according to J. P. Mallory) in light of toponymic evidence: only a percent of place names north of the Danube betray "pan-Thracian" roots. The hypothesis of a Thraco-Dacian or Daco-Thracian branch of IE, indicating a close link between the Thracian and Dacian languages, has numerous adherents, including Russu 1967, Georg Solta 1980, Vraciu 1980, Crossland, Trask (2000), McHenry (1993), Mihailov (2008). Crossland (1982) considers that the divergence of a presumed original Thraco-Dacian language into northern and southern groups of dialects is not so significant as to rank them as separate languages. According to Georg Solta (1982), there is no significant difference between Dacian and Thracian. Rădulescu (1984) accepts that Daco-Moesian possesses a certain degree of dialectal individuality, but argues that there is no fundamental separation between Daco-Moesian and Thracian. Polomé (1982) considers that the evidence presented by Georgiev and Duridanov, although substantial, is not sufficient to determine whether Daco-Moesian and Thracian were two dialects of the same language or two distinct languages.

In the 1950s, the Bulgarian linguist Vladimir I. Georgiev published his work which argued that Dacian and Albanian should be assigned to a language branch termed Daco-Mysian, Mysian (the term Mysian derives from the Daco-Thracian tribe known as the Moesi) being thought of as a transitional language between Dacian and Thracian. Georgiev argued that Dacian and Thracian are different languages, with different phonetic systems, his idea being supported by the placenames, which end in -dava in Dacian and Mysian, as opposed to -para, in Thracian placenames. Georgiev argues that the distance between Dacian and Thracian was approximately the same as that between the Armenian and Persian languages. The claim of Georgiev that Albanian is a direct recent descendant of 'Daco-Moesian' is highly based on speculations that have been thoroughly dismantled by other scholars.

=== Balto-Slavic ===
The Baltic classification of Dacian and Thracian was proposed by the Lithuanian polymath Jonas Basanavičius, referred to as "Patriarch of Lithuania", who insisted this is the most important work of his life and listed 600 identical words of Balts and Thracians and was the first to investigate similarities in vocal traditions between Lithuanians and Bulgarians. He also theoretically included Dacian and Phrygian in the related group, but a part of this inclusion is not supported by earlier authors, such as the 1976 linguistic analysis by Ivan Duridanov which claims Phrygian lacks parallels in either Thracian or Baltic languages.

The Bulgarian linguist Ivan Duridanov, in his first publication, claimed that Thracian and Dacian are genetically linked to the Baltic languages and in the next one he made the following classification:

"The Thracian language formed a close group with the Baltic (resp. Balto-Slavic), the Dacian and the 'Pelasgian' languages. More distant were its relations with the other Indo-European languages, and especially with Greek, the Italic and Celtic languages, which exhibit only isolated phonetic similarities with Thracian; the Tokharian and the Hittite were also distant."

Of about 200 reconstructed Thracian words by Duridanov, most cognates (138) appear in the Baltic languages, mostly in Lithuanian, followed by Germanic (61), Indo-Aryan (41), Greek (36), Bulgarian (23), Latin (10) and Albanian (8). The use of toponyms is suggested to determine the extent of a culture's influence. Parallels have enabled linguists, using the techniques of comparative linguistics, to decipher the meanings of several Dacian and Thracian placenames with, they claim, a high degree of probability. Of 300 attested Thracian geographic names, most parallels were found between Thracian and Baltic geographic names in the study of Duridanov. According to Duridanov,

"the similarity of these parallels stretching frequently on the main element and the suffix simultaneously, which makes a strong impression".

He also reconstructed Dacian words and Dacian placenames and found parallels mostly in the Baltic languages, followed by Albanian.

Other Slavic authors noted that Dacian and Thracian have much in common with Baltic onomastics and explicitly not in any similar way with Slavic onomastics, including cognates and parallels of lexical isoglosses, which implies a recent common ancestor.

After creating a list of names of rivers and personal names with a high number of parallels, the Romanian linguist Mircea M. Radulescu classified the Daco-Moesian and Thracian as Baltic languages, result of Baltic expansion to the south and also proposed such classification for Illyrian.

The American linguist Harvey Mayer refers to both Dacian and Thracian as Baltic languages and refers to them as Southern or Eastern Baltic. He claims to have sufficient evidence for classifying them as Baltoidic or at least "Baltic-like", if not exactly, Baltic dialects or languages and classifies Dacians and Thracians as "Balts by extension". Mayer claims that he extracted an unambiguous evidence for regarding Dacian and Thracian as more tied to Lithuanian than to Latvian.

Finally, I label Thracian and Dacian as East Baltic ... The fitting of special Dacian and Thracian features (which I identified from Duridanov's listings) into Baltic isogloss patterns so that I identified Dacian and Thracian as southeast Baltic. South Baltic because, like Old Prussian, they keep unchanged the diphthongs ei, ai, en, an (north Baltic Lithuanian and Latvian show varying percentages of ei, ai to ie, and en, an to ę, ą (to ē, ā) in Lithuanian, to ie, uo in Latvian). East Baltic because the Dacian word žuvete (now in Rumanian spelled juvete) has ž, not z as in west Baltic, and the Thracian word pušis (the Latin-Greek transcription shows pousis which, I believe, reflects -š-.) with zero grade puš- as in Lithuanian pušìs rather than with e-grade *peuš- as in Prussian peusē. Zero grade in this word is east Baltic, e-grade here is west Baltic, while the other word for "pine, evergreen", preidē (Prussian and Dacian), priede (Latvian), is marginal in Lithuanian matched by no *peus- in Latvian.

== Politicized and discarded theories ==
After the 1960s, some linguists argued in Bulgarian and Soviet journals that no strong evidence for Thraco-Illyrian exists, and that the two language-areas show more differences than correspondences (Vladimir Georgiev, Ivan Duridanov, Eric Hamp, Mircea Radulescu, et al.). However, it was pointed out that such onomastic studies were carried out through pan-Thracian and pan-Illyrian approaches, which are considered outdated and not objective in current historical linguistics.

== See also ==
- Balkan sprachbund
- Romanian words of possible Dacian origin (and comparison with Albanian words)
- Venetic language

== Bibliography ==
- Crossland, R.A.; Boardman, John (1982). "Linguistic problems of the Balkan area in the late prehistoric and early Classical period". The Cambridge Ancient History Volume 3, Part 1. Cambridge University Press. ISBN 978-0-521-22496-3.
- Hamp, Eric P. (1980). "Thracian, Dacian and Albanian–Romanian Correspondences". Actes du IIe Congrès international de thracologie: Linguistique, ethnologie (ethnographie, folkloristique et art populaire), anthropologie. Editura Academiei Republicii Socialiste România. pp. 57–60.
- Hamp, Eric; Adams, Douglas (August 2013). "The Expansion of the Indo-European Languages: An Indo-Europeanist's Evolving View" (PDF). Sino-Platonic Papers. 239.
- Hyllested, Adam; Joseph, Brian D. (2022). "Albanian". The Indo-European Language Family. Cambridge University Press. ISBN 9781108499798.
- Ismajli, Rexhep (2015). Eqrem Basha (ed.). Studime për historinë e shqipes në kontekst ballkanik [Studies on the History of Albanian in the Balkan context] (in Albanian). Prishtinë: Kosova Academy of Sciences and Arts, special editions CLII, Section of Linguistics and Literature.
- Kortlandt, Frederik (2003). "The Thraco-Armenian consonant shift". In Beekes, Robert S. P. (ed.). Armeniaca: Comparative Notes. Caravan Books. ISBN 9780882061061.
- Majer, Marek (2019). "Parahistoria indoevropiane e fjalës shqipe për 'motrën'" [Indo-European Prehistory of the Albanian Word for 'Sister']. Seminari Ndërkombëtar për Gjuhën, Letërsinë dhe Kulturën Shqiptare [International Seminar for Albanian Language, Literature and Culture] (in Albanian). 1 (38). University of Prishtina: 252–266. ISSN 2521-3687.
- Matzinger, Joachim (2012). "Herkunft des Albanischen: Argumente gegen die thrakische Hypothese" [Origin of Albanian: Arguments Against the Thracian Hypothesis]. In Rugova, Bardh (ed.). Studime për nder të Rexhep Ismajlit: me rastin e 65vjetorit të lindjes. Koha. pp. 635–649. ISBN 9789951417761.
- Mërkuri, Nexhip (2015). "Gjuhësia e përgjithshme dhe këndvështrimet bashkëkohore për Epirin dhe mesapët" [General Linguistics and Contemporary Perspectives on Epirus and the Messapians]. In Ibrahimi, Zeqirija (ed.). Shaban Demiraj – figurë e shquar e albanologjisë dhe ballkanologjisë [Shaban Demiraj – prominent figure of Albanianology and Balkanology] (in Albanian). Instituti i Trashëgimisë Shpirtërore e Kulturore të Shqiptarëve – Shkup. p. 57. ISBN 9786084653240.
- Polomé, Edgar Charles (1982). "Balkan Languages (Illyrian, Thracian and Daco-Moesian)". Cambridge Ancient History. Vol. III.1. pp. 866–888.
- Yntema, Douwe (2017). "The Pre-Roman Peoples of Apulia (1000-100 BC)". In Gary D. Farney, Guy Bradley (ed.). The Peoples of Ancient Italy. De Gruyter Reference. Walter de Gruyter GmbH & Co KG. pp. 337–. ISBN 9781614513001.
