= Braniștea, Dâmbovița =

Braniștea
- Commune
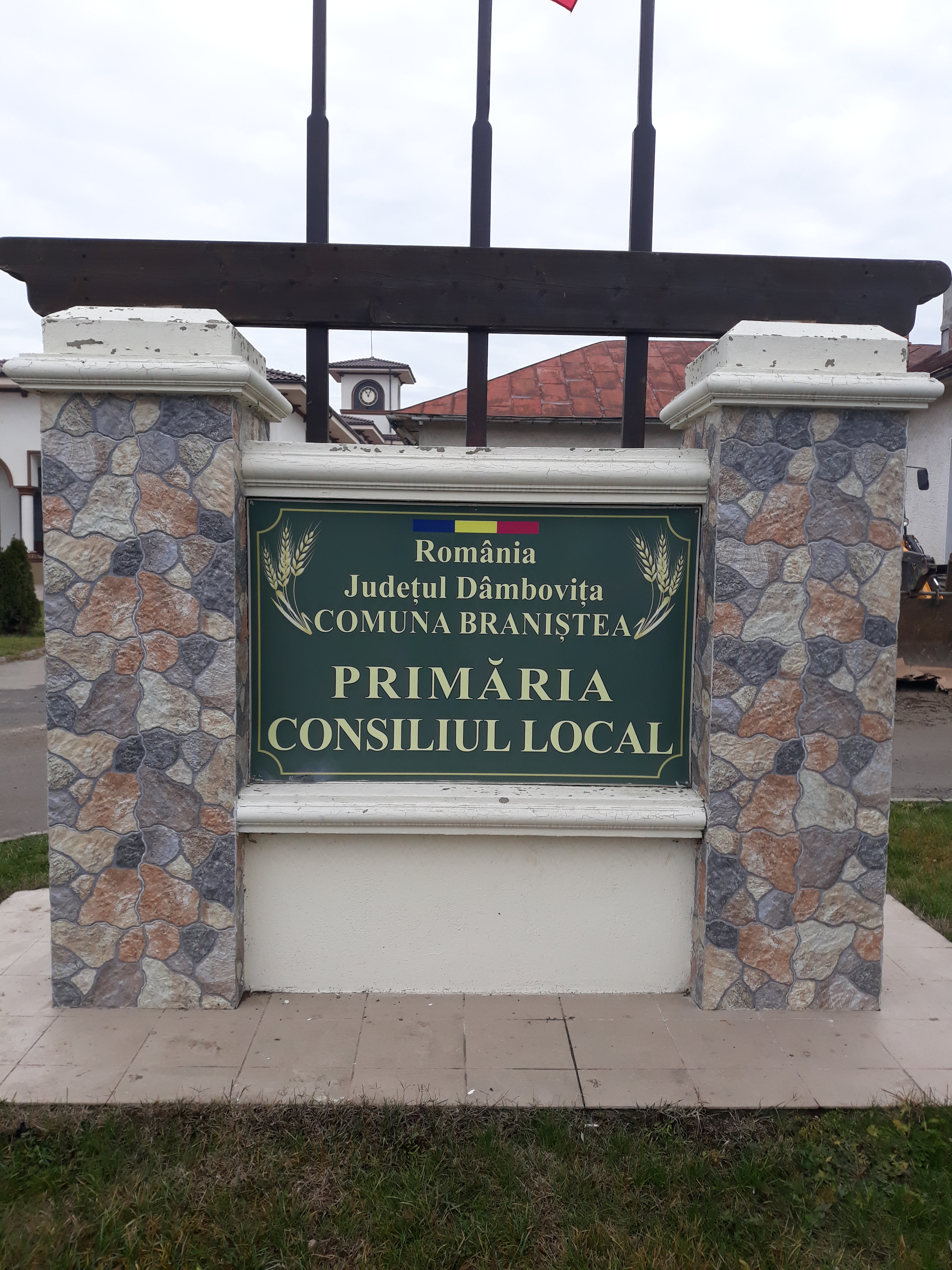
- Braniștea town hall

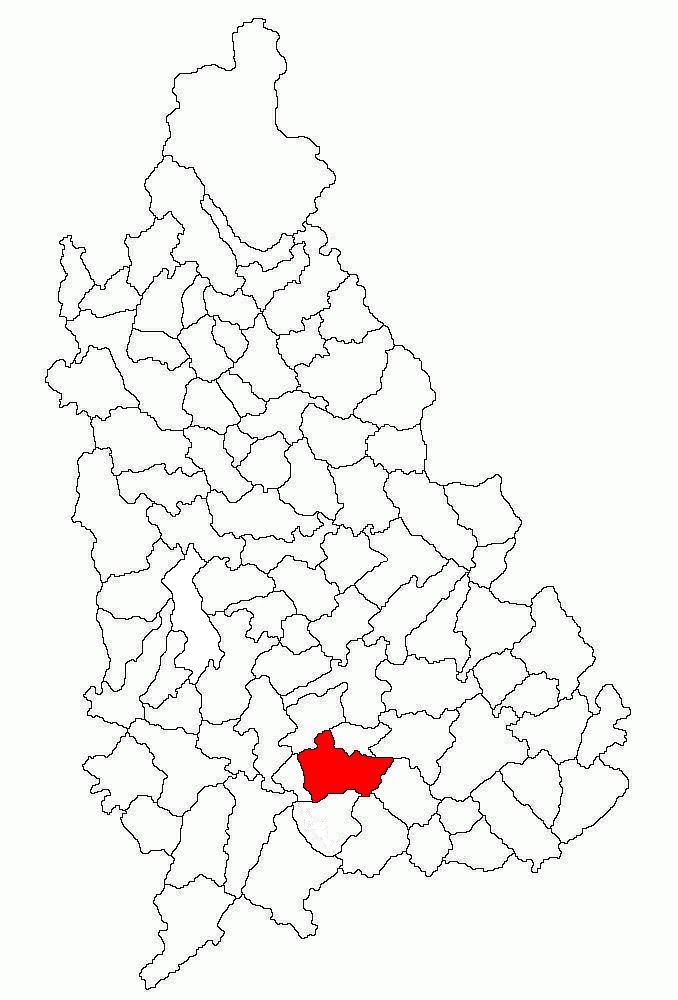
- Location in Dâmbovița County

- Location in Romania
- Coordinates: 44°41′N 25°35′E
- Country: Romania
- County: Dâmbovița

Government
  - Mayor (2021–2024): Mihai Vișinescu (PNL)
- Area: 20.2 km^{2} (7.8 sq mi)
- Elevation: 165 m (541 ft)
- Population (2021-12-01): 3,790
  - Density: 188/km^{2} (486/sq mi)
- Time zone: UTC+02:00 (EET)
  - Summer (DST): UTC+03:00 (EEST)
- Vehicle reg.: DB
- Website: www.primaria-branistea.ro

Braniștea is a commune in Dâmbovița County, Muntenia, Romania. It is composed of three villages: Braniștea, Dâmbovicioara, and Săvești.

Historical population
Year	Pop.	±%
2002	4,476	—
2011	4,398	−1.7%
2021	3,790	−13.8%
Source: Census data

== Natives ==
- Sorin Paliga (born 1956), linguist and politician
- Niculae M. Popescu (1881–1963), theologian, historian, and priest of the Romanian Orthodox Church
