= List of Romanian words of possible pre-Roman origin =

The Eastern Romance languages developed from the Proto-Romanian language, which in turn developed from the Vulgar Latin spoken in a region of the Balkans which has not yet been exactly determined, but is generally agreed to have been a region north of the Jireček Line.

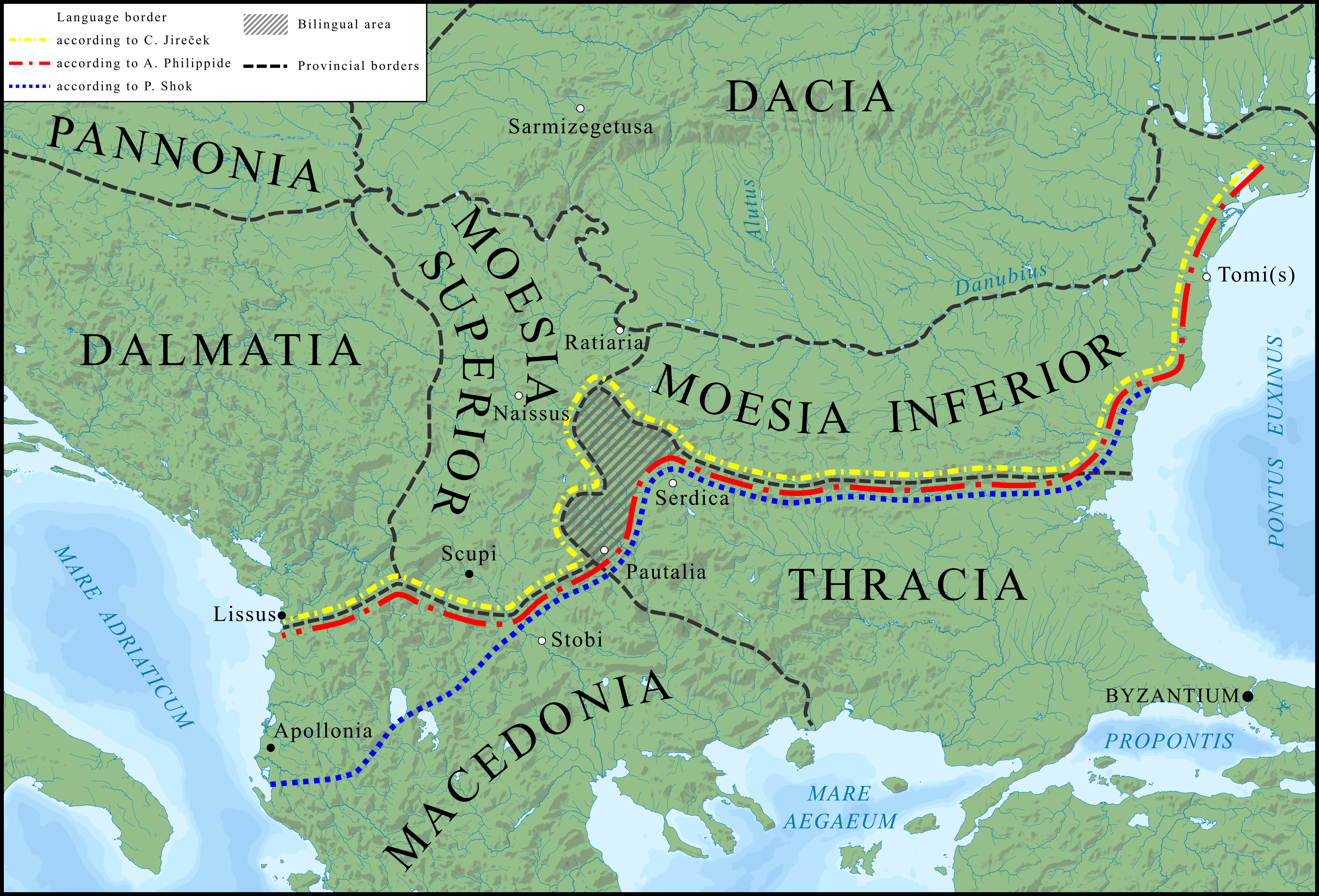
The Jireček Line

That there was language contact between Latin or Vulgar Latin speakers and speakers of indigenous Paleo-Balkan languages in the area is a certainty; however, it is not known which Paleo-Balkan language or languages comprise the substratal influence in the Eastern Romance languages.

In addition to vocabulary items, some other features of Eastern Romance, such as phonological features and elements of grammar (see Balkan sprachbund) may also be from Paleo-Balkan languages.

== Lexical items ==
Older Romanian etymological dictionaries tended to assume a borrowing in many cases, usually from a Slavic language or from Hungarian, but etymological analysis may show that, in many cases, the direction of borrowing was from Romanian to the neighboring languages. The current Dicționar explicativ (DEX) published by the Romanian Academy continues to list many words as borrowings, though the work of other linguists (Sorin Olteanu, Sorin Paliga, Ivan Duridanov, et al.) may indicate that a number of these are in fact indigenous, from local Indo-European languages.

Though the substratum status of many Romanian words is not much disputed, their status as Dacian words is controversial, some more than others. There are no significant surviving written examples of the Dacian language, so it is difficult to verify in most cases whether a given Romanian word is actually from Dacian or not. Many of the pre-Roman lexical items of Romanian have Albanian parallels, and if they are in fact substratum words cognates with the Albanian ones, and not loanwords from Albanian, it indicates that the substrate language of Romanian may have been on the same Indo-European branch as Albanian.

The Bulgarian Thracologist Vladimir Georgiev developed the theory that the Romanian language has a "Daco-Moesian" language as its substrate, a hypothesized language that according to him had a number of features which distinguished it from the Thracian language spoken further south, across the Haemus range.

According to Romanian historian Ion I. Russu, there are supposedly over 160 Romanian words of Dacian origin, representing, together with derivates, 10% of the basic Romanian vocabulary. But through the scantly documented Dacian linguistic material such origin can't be proven. Attested Dacian plant names that were collected by Dioscorides and Pseudo-Apuleius do not belong to the Romanian lexicon.

Below is a list of Romanian words of possible pre-Roman origin. Some early scholars have speculated that they are of Dacian origin, but there is no evidence for it. A number of the words are clear loanwords from attested languages.

Word / Name	English	Sources	Notes – Alternative etymologies
abeș	really, for sure!	Hasdeu, Vraciu, Paliga	dialectal Banat; a+beș < IE *bhend(s)- 'to bind', cf. Albanian besë 'word of honor; faith', besabesë 'on my honor!'
Abud	Abud, village in Mureș County	Paliga	related to Thracian Aba, Abantes, Abro-lebas. Cf. Romanian Abrud, abur, Pre-Indo-European ultimately from *AB- 'elevated, prominent'
abur(e)	steam, vapour	Hasdeu, Russu (Alb.), Vraciu, Paliga	Aromanian abur(ã); cf. Albanian avull Proto-Albanian *abulā 'steam, vapour'; cf. Romanian boare. Ultimately from Pre-Indo-European *AB- 'prominence, elevation'
aburca	'to climb up'	Paliga	Prefix ab (see above) + urca: ultimately from Pre-Indo-European *OR- / *UR- 'big, huge, giant' related with Greek ouranizo 'to go up, to climb' derived from Ouranos 'sky'.
ad-, at-		Paliga	Pre-Indo-European, spread across whole Europe. Inherited via Thracian.
adaru	I make; I set up, I set an ornament	Paliga	Aromanian; from Indo-European *der-, dra- 'to work'; cf. Greek δράω, Lithuanian daraù, Latvian darît 'to make'
adulmeca	'to sniff, to smell'	Paliga	probably *ad-ul-m-ec-a. Substatum root -ulm- related to olm 'smell'; derivative suffix -ec also indigenous. Similar construction to adămană, ademeni. The Thracian root must be *olm-, *ulm- 'smell, to smell; to sniff; to track an animal for hunt' or dul-, dol- 'dog', see dulău, dolcă.
ag-	archaic 'to get to a thorn'	Paliga	Cf. agănău, agăța. Related to Thracian names Aga-thyr-soi, Aeg-issus (Tulcea). agăța is seemingly derived from the same root.
Agaua	Agaua village, Brăila county	Paliga	related to Agnita, Agăș, Agriș/agriș, cf. Agay, Provence, and Aigai, Greece. See ag-.
agănău	a kind of folk dance	Paliga	related to root ag-.
Agăș	Agăș, Bacău county, Bihor county	Paliga	Today extinct. The village in Bihor is near a hill called Acățel which can be used to reject an etymology from agas 'crossroad, branched out'. Cf. Thracian Aegissus; the spelling -ss- might stand for an original š in Thracian. Also place names Egeria, Egirca, Egeta, Aegeta and in Hungary Ágasvár seems related, in which case it could be Pre-Magyar.
aghiuță	devil	Hasdeu	from Greek ágios (άγιος) 'holy' + -uță.
Agnita	Agnita, Serbia	Paliga	cf. Thracian, Ancient Greek Aegitna, Aigaios
amurg, -uri	'sunset'	Paliga	related to the name of the Greek island Amorgós, and amorgís, -ídos textile plant (Chantraine). Probably from Preie. *AM-, *AN-
andrea	knitting needle	Russu	Muntenian/Transylvanian undrea; from Andrea, Undrea 'December', from Greek Andréas 'St. Andrew's Day' (Nov. 30th); from the tradition of knitting socks on St. Andrew's Day. Similar to Alb. shëndreu 'November', after Shën Ndreu 'St. Andrew'.
argea	loom	Hasdeu, Russu (Alb.), Vraciu	plural argele; from Greek argaleiós; also Albanian dial. argali 'small, wooden loom' (< Gk)
baligă	dung, manure (used mostly for cow dung)	Russu (Alb.)	Aromanian baligã, Megleno-Romanian balig, Istro-Romanian bålege; from Old Albanian baljëgë (modern bajgë, dial. balgë, balëg, balëgë); also Serbo-Croatian bȁlega (< Alb)
baltă	pool, puddle	Russu (Alb.)	Aromanian baltã, Megleno-Romanian baltă, Istro-Romanian bote; from Albanian baltë 'swamp'.
barză	stork (Ciconia ciconia)	Hasdeu, Russu, Vraciu, Olteanu	Oltenia bardăș, bardoș 'stork', Transylvanian/Aromanian/Megleno-Romanian bardzu 'white'; feminine of barz 'whitish (of birds)', from Albanian bardhë 'white', bardhosh, bardhash 'whitish'
bălaur, balaur	dragon, monster	Hasdeu, Russu (Alb.), Vraciu	from Serbo-Croatian blȁvor (variants blavur, blaor) 'scheltopusik', from Albanian bullar (var. buljar, bollar).
băga	to insert, thrust	Russu	Aromanian bagu 'to put', Megleno-Romanian bagari; from Byzantine Greek bázo (βάζω) 'to put in or on, set down'
băl, bălan, bălaș	fair-haired, blond (person); white-haired (animal)	Hasdeu	from Albanian bal(ë) 'white-haired; starred forehead', balosh, balash 'white-marked, piebald; dappled; hoary, white-haired'
bâr	call to a sheep	Vraciu	from Albanian berr 'sheep or goat; small livestock'; cf. Czech beran 'ram', Polish/Ukrainian/Russian baran (< Romanian); Canavese berro 'ram', Piemontese bero 'id.' (< Alb)
brad	fir (Abies)	Hasdeu, Russu (Alb.), Olteanu	Aromanian brad; from Proto-Albanian *brada (modern bredh).
brânză	cheese	Hasdeu, Russu, Vraciu	Aromanian brãndzã, Megleno-Romanian brǫnză; from Albanian brëndës 'intestines; rennet bag (made of stomach)', identical to rânză (< rrëndës) (see below); Romanian lent Transylvanian German Pränz, Slovak/Polish bryndza, which gave Austrian Brimsen.
brâu	belt, waist	Russu (Alb.)	dialectal brân, colloquial brână, Aromanian brãnu, Megleno-Romanian brǫn, Istro-Romanian brĕne; from Old Albanian *bren (modern brez 'belt; waist', mbrej 'to buckle'); replaced Transylvanian/Bucovina balț 'loop, eye(let), ring (of iron)' (cf. Aromanian balțu), from Latin balteus 'belt'.
brusture	burdock (Arctium lappa)	Russu (Alb.)	Aromanian broshtur, brushturã; from Albanian brushtull 'heather'
bucura	to be glad	Russu (Alb.)	also bucuros 'glad'; from Albanian bukuroj 'to beautify', bukurosh 'beautiful', both from bukur 'nice, lovely' (Note: See also: E Bukura e Dheut ('The Beauty of the Earth'), Albanian mythological character.)
bunget	dense, dark forest	Hasdeu, Russu (Alb.), Vraciu	from Albanian bung 'chestnut oak' + Romanian -et 'grove'.
burtă	belly, stomach	Russu	dialectal borț 'pregnant woman's belly'
buză	lip; edge	Russu (Alb.)	Aromanian budzã "lip; brim"; from Albanian buzë "lip; edge"
Buzău	Buzău, Buzău county	Paliga	Attested in antiquity as Μουσεος
cață	shepherd's rod, crook	Russu	also descăța "to unhook"; See acăța above.
căpușă	sheep ked (Melophagus ovinus)	Russu (Alb.)	from Albanian këpushë 'tick', derivative of kap 'to grip, snatch'
căpută	toe (of shoe); low boot	Russu (Alb.)	from Albanian këputë "sole (of shoe)", këpucë "shoe"; unrelated to Slavic kopyto "hoof" > Romanian copită
cătun	hamlet	Russu (Alb.)	from Albanian katund (dial. katun, kotun) 'village; herdsmen community; widely spread-out village"
cioară	crow	Sala, Hasdeu, Vraciu	Aromanian cioarã, Megleno-Romanian čoară; from Old Albanian *corrë (mod. sorrë)
ciut	hornless, poll; one-horned	Russu (Alb.)	dialectal șut; from Slavic; cf. Bulgarian/Serbo-Croatian šut; also Albanian shyt 'hornless' (connected to "sutë" (a doe, female deer) (an Albanism in the other Balkan languages)
curma	to stop abruptly, interrupt	Russu (Alb.)	older curmez, from Byzantine Greek kormázein (κορμάζω); cf. Albanian kurmua
curpăn	vine, twining stem	Russu (Alb.)	from Albanian kurpën, kurpër 'clematis', from kurp 'traveller's joy, old man's beard (Clematis vitalba)'; related to below.
cursă	trap, snare	Russu (Alb.), Olteanu	from Albanian kurth(ë), contraction of dial. kurpth, diminutive of kurp; related to above.
custură	blade, knife edge, knife	Russu	variants custure, cusutură, cuțitură, from cuțit "knife' + suffix -tură
daș	ram (male sheep)	Russu (Alb.)	from Albanian dash
doină	lamenting folksong	Hasdeu, Vraciu	Transylvanian daină; from Lithuanian dainà 'folksong' (cf. Latvian daĩn̨a), derivative of Proto-Baltic *deî- (cf. Latvian diêt, dìet 'to dance, hop; sing')
droaie	crowd, multitude; a lot	Russu	back-formation from the plural droi, from Albanian droe, droje 'fear'; same sense development in Rom. groază 'horror' > o groază de 'a lot of'.
Dunăre	The Danube river	Paliga	Dac. *Dan-ar- cf. NFl Aar, Aare
fărâmă	crumb, morsel, bit	Russu (Alb.)	variant sfărâmă, Aromanian sãrmã; from Albanian thërrime, from ther 'to stab, slaughter, snip'
gard	fence	Russu (Alb.)	Istro-Romanian gård "wattle gate to a pen"; from Albanian gardh; unrelated to Slavic gradŭ > Alb gradë
gata	ready, done	Russu (Alb.)	from Albanian gat(i) "ready", from gatuaj 'to ready, prepare; cook', from Slavic *gotovati; cf. Serbo-Croatian gotov "ready", Polish gotowy.
gălbează	liver rot (fasciolosis), sheep pox	Russu (Alb.)	variant călbează; from Albanian gëlbazë, këlbazë, klëbacë 'sheep pox', itself from the Albanian word "kalb" (to rot, to go bad) with a diminutive suffix -zë, commonly seen in disease names.
ghimpe	thorn	Russu (Alb.)	from Albanian gjemb (dialectal Tosk gjëmp, Arvanite gljimp, Gheg glëmp)
ghionoaie	woodpecker	Sala, Russu (Alb.)	dialectal ghionoi, ghin, Aromanian ǵionu 'tawny owl'; from Albanian gjon 'scops owl', from Gjon 'John'; Albanian also has qukapik 'woodpecker' (< qukë 'owl' + pik 'woodpecker')
ghiuj	gaffer, old fogey	Hasdeu, Vraciu	Aromanian ghiush; from Albanian gjysh "grandfather"
gordin	kind of grapes used in winemaking	Hasdeu	variants gordean, g(o)ardină, gorgan, gordan; from Russian gordina "currant"
grapă	harrow	Russu (Alb.)	from Albanian grep (var. grap) 'hook'.
gresie	sandstone, whetstone	Russu (Alb.)	Aromanian greasã; from Albanian gërresë (var. grresë) 'rasp, scraper; drawing knife', from gërryej 'to scrape, scour'
grumaz	neck	Russu (Alb.), NODEX	Aromanian grumadz, gurmadz; from Albanian gurmaz 'gaping maw, wide-open jaws; esophagus' (variants gurmac, grumas, gërmaz), itself from kurm 'trunk (of the body), torso' (> Romanian dial. curm 'short rope', curmei 'vine shoot')
grunz	lump, clod	Russu (Alb.)	variants (s)grunț, Aromanian grundã (plural grundz) 'lump', grundzã 'bran'; from Albanian krunde 'coarse bran; sawdust' (var. grundë), derivative of kruaj 'to scratch'
gudura	to fawn, cajole	Russu	from Albanian gudulis 'to tickle; pleasure'; unrelated to Romanian gâdila 'to tickle' (see above).
iazmă (Banat)	ugly and evil apparition, ghost	Hasdeu	western aiazmă, eastern agheazmă; from Greek agíasma (αγίασμα) 'holy water; sacred spring'.
întrema	to recover after illness or fatigue	Russu	variants întrăma, (Moldavia, Bucovina) întrarma, back-formation from destrăma 'unweave, unravel, break up'.
leagăn	cradle, swing	Russu	variants leangăn, leagănă; Istro-Romanian leagăr; back-formation of legăna "to rock, swing" (cf. Aromanian leagãnu "to swing", Megleno-Romanian legăn), from Byzantine Greek liknon "cradle"; likewise Albanian lëkund "to swing"
mal	lakeside shore, riverbank; coast	Sala, Hasdeu, Russu (Alb.), Vraciu	from Albanian mal "mountain"
maldac, măldac	a small load (of wood, hay, etc.)	Hasdeu	from Greek mandákis
mazăre	pea (Pisum sativum)	Hasdeu, Russu (Alb.), Vraciu, Olteanu	Aromanian madzãre; also Romanian măzăriche 'vetch', Aromanian mãdziriclje; from Albanian modhull(ë) 'yellow vetchling', diminutive of modhë 'rye-grass, brome'
mânz	foal, colt	Russu (Alb.)	Aromanian mãndzu, Megleno-Romanian mǫndz; from Old Albanian manz (modern Tosk mëz, Gheg mâz). Also mânzat 'steer', from OAlb. *manzat (mod. Tosk mëzat, Gheg mâzat 'yearling calf; bullock'). (Note: The Messapic word menza ('foal') and Gaulish manduos ('foal') are also considered cognates.) (Note: An obscure deity called Jove or Juppiter Menzanas is attested in relation to the Messapians of Sallentini.)
măgură	hill, knoll	Sala, Russu (Alb.)	dialectal Romanian măgulă, Aromanian mãgulã; from Albanian magulë, a metathesis of gamulë; likewise Serbo-Croatian gòmila ~ mògila 'heap'.
mire	bridegroom	Hasdeu, Russu, Vraciu	from Albanian mirë 'good'; replaced Old Romanian măritu (still used in Muntenia).
moș	old man	Russu (Alb.)	back-formed from moașă 'midwife' (cf. Aromanian moashe, Megleno-Romanian moașă 'old woman'), from Albanian moshë 'age', moshëm 'old, aged'; replaced Old Romanian auș (still in Oltenia), from Latin avus.
mozoc	large shepherd dog	Hasdeu	variant mosoc
mugure	bud	Russu (Alb.)	from Albanian mugull "bud, sprout"
Mureș	Mureș river	Paliga	Ancient Maris, from IE *māro, *māno 'wet' and related to Romanian a mura 'to pickle'
murg	dark-bay horse	Sala, Russu (Alb.)	Aromanian murgu, Megleno-Romanian murg; also amurg 'twilight, dusk'; from Albanian murg "dark".
mușat	handsome	Russu	Aromanian musheat, Megleno-Romanian/Istro-Romanian mușat; clipped form of *frumușat, from frumos
noian	multitude, heap; (arch.) abyss, immense sea	Sala, Russu	from Albanian ujanë "ocean", from ujë "water"
păstaie	pod, capsule, hull	Russu (Alb.)	Aromanian pãstãlje; from Vulgar Latin pistālia, from pistāre "to pound"; or from Albanian bishtajë "pod, hull; string bean"
pârâu (pl. pâraie)	brook, creek	Russu (Alb.)	dial. (North) pârău, Megleno-Romanian păroi; from Albanian përrua (def.sg. përroi) 'torrent, rushing stream', from Bulgarian poroj (порой) 'torrent', from *po-rojĭ (cf. Macedonian roj (рој) 'swarm', Polish zdrój 'spring, waters').
păstra	to keep up	Russu	older păstrez; Aromanian spãstrescu, Megleno-Romanian păstres; from Greek pastrevo (παστρεύω) 'to clean, cleanse', from Byzantine Greek spastréuō; cf. Bulgarian pastrja (< Greek)
Proca	name of person	Paliga	related to Dac. NL Napoca
pupăză	hoopoe	Sala	Aromanian pupãzã, Megleno-Romanian pupează; from Albanian pupëz(ë), diminutive of pupë, itself possibly from Latin upupa
pururi	always, forever	Russu (Alb.)	variant purure, pururea; from d(e-a) pure(a)
rânză	abomasum (rennet stomach)	Hasdeu, Russu (Alb.), Vraciu	Aromanian arãndzã 'rennet'; from Albanian rrëndës 'rennet'.
sâmbure	kernel; pip, core	Russu (Alb.), NODEX, Olteanu	dialectal simbure, sumbure, Aromanian sãmbure, sumbur; from Albanian sumbull "push button; bud"
scăpăra	to strike fire; sparkle, lighten	Russu (Alb.)	Aromanian ascãpirare, Megleno-Romanian scăpirari; from Albanian shkrep "to strike fire", shkrepës "flint"
scrum	ashes	Russu (Alb.)	older scrumb; from Albanian shkrumb; also Bulgarian скрум (< Romanian)
searbăd	insipid	Russu (Alb.), Olteanu	older sarbăd, Aromanian sarbit; from Albanian tharbët "sour" (standard thartë, dialectal tharptë)
spânz	purple hellebore	Russu (Alb.)	variants spânț, spunz, Aromanian spingiu; from Albanian shpendër (variants shpindër, spindër, spinër)
steregie	soot caked in a chimney; scum; dross, waste; wine tartar	Russu	variants stirigie, stirighie, etc.; from variants tereghie, tirghie, etc. "wine tartar", from Greek trugiá, blended with Serbo-Croatian striješ (Chakavian striš) "wine tartar"
sterp	barren, infertile	Russu (Alb.)	eastern stărp, Aromanian sterpu; from Byzantine Greek stérifos (στέριφος; mod. stérfos (στέρφος)); cf. Albanian shterpë, Slovene stirpa, Venetian sterpa (all < Gk).
strepede	cheese maggot (larva of the cheese fly, cheese skipper; Piophila casei)	Russu (Alb.)	Aromanian streapit "cheese mite", Megleno-Romanian strepij; from Albanian shtrep "maggot, larva"
strungă	sheepfold; narrow passage, canyon	Russu (Alb.), NODEX	from Albanian shtrungë 'milking enclosure', from shtroj 'to spread'
sugruma	to strangle, to burke	Russu	from sub "under" + grumaz "throat" (see above).
șir	row, line	Hasdeu, Russu	also șiră "spine"; from Greek sirá (σειρά) 'line, row; cord, rope'
șopârlă	wall lizard (Lacerta muralis)	Hasdeu, Russu (Alb.), Vraciu	variant șopirlă, Aromanian ciupilar (recent jabilu, șapic, japie); from Albanian zhapi (plural zhapinj) 'lizard' (var. xhapi, xhzpik).
traistă	bag	Hasdeu	older taistră, tainstră, traistră, Bassarabia/Maramarus straistă, Transylvanian straiță; cf. Albanian trastë, trajstë, strajcë.
țap	he-goat; buck	Russu (Alb.)	from Albanian cjap (var. cap, cqap, sqap).
țarc	pen, fold	Russu (Alb.), Olteanu	from Albanian thark (var. cark) 'enclosure (esp. for milking)'.
țumburuș	small, round knob, nub	Olteanu	older țâmburuș; from Albanian thumbull 'button; pin'; nearly identical to sâmbure (< sumbull) (see above).
urca	to mount, ascend; increase	Russu, Paliga	Either from Vulgar Latin *oricāre, frequentative of orior "to rise" or ultimately from Pre-Indo-European *OR- / *UR- 'big, huge, giant' related with Greek ouranizo 'to go up, to climb' derived from Ouranos 'sky'.
urdă	ricotta	Hasdeu, Russu, Vraciu	from dialectal Albanian urdhë (standard udhos, dialectal urdhos)
vatră	hearth, fireplace; home	Hasdeu, Russu (Alb).	from Tosk Albanian vatër (Note: See also: Nëna e Vatrës, Albanian goddess of the hearth fire.)
vătui	yearling kid (goat); hare	Russu (Alb.)	older vătuiu, Aromanian vitulju, Megleno-Romanian vitul'u; from Byzantine Greek *vitoúlion (*βιτούλιον; modern Lefkada vitũli (βιτοῦλι)); also Albanian ftujë (Cham ftulë, Arbëresh vëtulë) 'female kid' (< ByzGk)
viezure	badger	Sala, Russu (Alb.), Olteanu	older viedzure, Aromanian yedzurã, yedzãre; from Albanian vjedhull, from vjedh "to steal"
zară	buttermilk	Russu	from *dzară, from Albanian dhallë; also Aromanian dhalã (recent loan; < Alb)
zburda	sport, frolic, frisk about	Russu	variant sburda; from Byzantine Greek spyrthizein 'to frolic, lark (of animals)'
zer	whey	Russu, Olteanu	older zăr, Aromanian dzãr, Moldavian/Banat/ dzăr masculine back-formation from zară (see above).
zgardă	dog collar	Russu (Alb.)	from Albanian shkardhë 'dog chain; (dial.) wicker gate in fence', from sh- + gardhë 'fence'.

- The Notes column contains information found in various dictionaries. "Not in current use" indicates words not found in dictionaries of contemporary Romanian.
- The Sources column indicates the linguist(s) or the works who suggested including the words in the list:
- "Sala": Marius Sala, De la latină la română (1998)
- "Hasdeu": Bogdan Petriceicu Hasdeu, Etymologicum Magnum Romaniae, 1894.
- "Russu": Ion I. Russu, Limba traco-dacilor, Editura Științifică, 1967. The words that have been identified by I. I. Russu to have cognates in Albanian are marked with (Alb.).
- "Vraciu": Ariton Vraciu, Limba daco-geților, Timișoara: Editura Facla, 1980.
- "NODEX": Noul dicționar explicativ al limbii române [The New Dictionary of the Romanian Language], Litera Internațional, 2002. In this dictionary substratum words are labeled cuvînt autohton "native word".
- "Olteanu": Sorin Olteanu, "The TDM Palatal".
- "Ciorănescu": Alexandru Ciorănescu, Diccionario etimológico rumano, Tenerife: Universidad de la Laguna, 1958–1966.
- Sorin Paliga, Etymological Lexicon of the Indigenous (Thracian) Elements in Romanian, Bucharest: Editura Evenimentul, 2006.

== Other languages ==
Some Romanian words of non-Latin origin are also found in Slavic languages, which loaned them from Eastern Romance speakers. An example is vatră (home or hearth), which Eastern Romance speakers borrowed from the Tosk Albanian form vatër ('hearth'), and thereafter spread to the Serbo-Croatian, Carpathian highlander dialects of Polish and Ukrainian and other neighboring languages, though acquiring in those languages a slightly modified meaning ('fire' instead of 'hearth'). Another one is Bryndza, a type of cheese made in Eastern Austria, Poland, the Czech Republic (Moravian Wallachia), Slovakia and Ukraine, the word being derived from the Romanian word for cheese (brânză).

== See also ==
- Substrate in Romanian
- Wiktionary: Romanian substratum words
- Romanian lexis
- Daco-Roman
- Daco-Romanian
- Vlachs
