= Bucur Church =

Church in Bucharest, Romania

Coordinates: 44°25′24.74″N 26°6′31.80″E

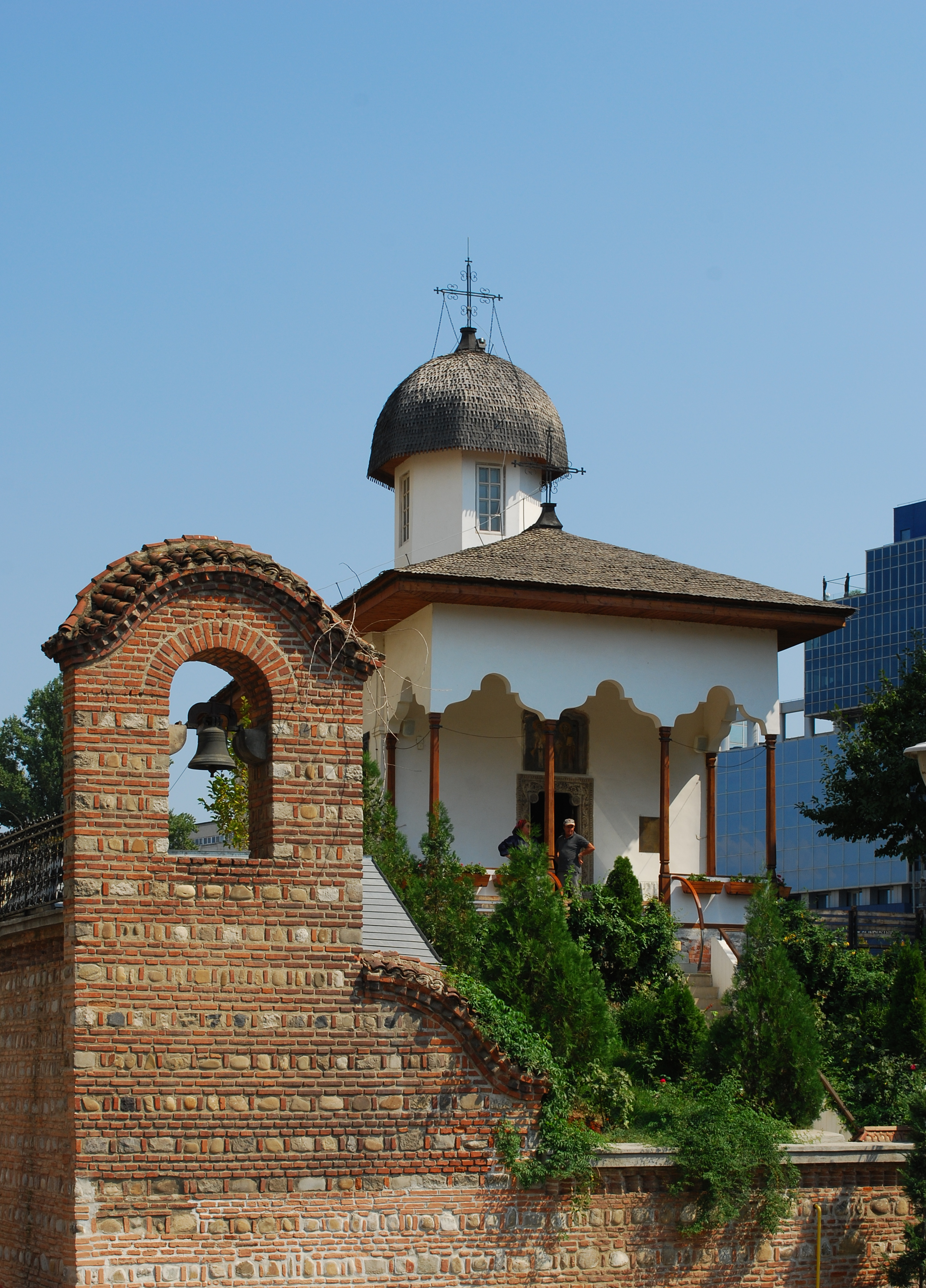
The church seen from the street

Bucur Church (Romanian: Biserica Bucur) is a Romanian Orthodox church located at 33 Radu Vodă Street, in Sector 4, Bucharest, Romania. It formerly served as the chapel for the Radu Vodă Monastery.

There is no exact date for the building of the church and this has been the subject of much discussion among Romanian historians. For a long time, many historians have insisted that the building is in a style specific to the 18th century, while others have held to the legend which claims that the church was built by the shepherd Bucur, whose name is also associated with the name of the city of Bucharest. The church is first recorded on a map drawn up between 1844 and 1846 with the name of Bucur Church.

== History ==
In the past, the church was located on the same hill as the Radu Vodă Monastery. In the 18th century the hill was divided in half to allow the building of a street through the middle.

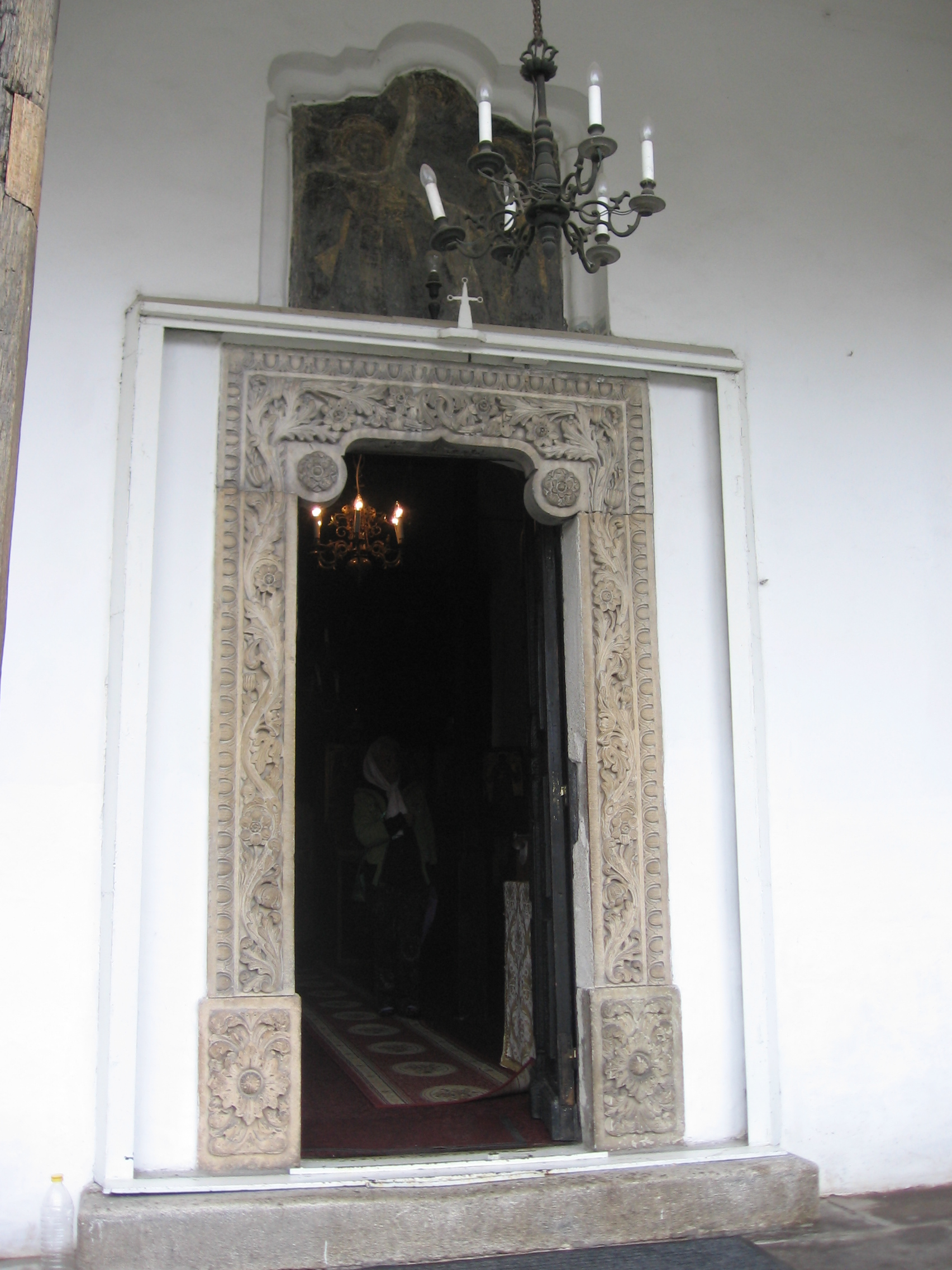
The entrance into the church

Although the church is recorded in a number of texts by both Romanian and foreign authors as having been built by the founder of Bucharest, the shepherd Bucur, later researchers have concluded that the building was constructed in the 17th century, and rebuilt in the first half of the 18th. Other researchers have established that the church was built in the first half of the 17th century to serve as the chapel to the Radu Vodă Monastery. There are also opinions of still other researchers who maintain that the church was built in 1416 by Mircea the Elder.

The church was restored between 1909 and 1910, when certain changes were made to the exterior.

== The controversy over the date of the church ==
In the work "The History of the Founding of the city of Bucharest – the Capital of the Kingdom of Romania – from 1330 to 1850" (Istoria fondarei orașului București – capitala Regatului Român – de la 1330 până la 1850) collected from many early writers and gathered together in 1891 by Dimitrie Papazoglu, are recorded many texts which assert that the church was built by the shepherd Bucur. Papazoglu himself has doubts about this, suggesting that the church was built in 1568 by Alexandru II Mircea, the son of Mircea III, also known as Mircea Ciobanu, "Mircea the Shepherd" in the cemetery of the Radu Vodă Monastery.

In 1938, Grigore Ionescu's guide to Bucharest stated that in 1869 the church was rebuilt with an identity 300 years older than that which it had previously had.

Until 1974, many of those who had studied the history of the church felt that the builder of the church could not be the shepherd Bucur, as Bucur himself appeared to be purely legendary, first appearing in a book on the Danubian Principalities by the British Consul William Wilkinson, published in London in 1820.

In 1835, this story was repeated in a geography text prepared by Iosif Genilie, professor at the Saint Sava School.

However, as a consequence of recent research, a manuscript by the Catholic Missionary Blasius Kleiner, written in 1761 has been discovered, which confirms the legend. Kleiner mentions the following in his text: "They say that this city gets its name from a certain shepherd or, as others say, a famous bandit, who was called Bucur. This man pastured his sheep in the field by the Dâmbovița River, and maybe there also carried out his banditry. Later, he built a church and began to build a few houses for himself and a few others."

Currently, Professor Marcel Dumitru Ciuca, who has overseen the republication of Dimitrie Papazoglu's work, feels that Papazoglu has misdated the building of the church, and that the legend of Bucur could be true, and that there is no evidence to suppose that there was no founder of Bucharest by the name of Bucur.

== Description ==
The church, dedicated to Saints Cyril of Alexandria and Pope Athanasius I of Alexandria, is small but well-proportioned. The walls are plain and painted white.

The entrance is made through a similarly elegant porch, similar to those found in peasant houses in Romania, supported by wooden posts. Above, the building has a cupola with a mushroom-shaped roof. The windows and doors are ornamented with carved stone, added at the beginning of the 20th century.

== Bibliography ==
- Grigore Ionescu. București. Ghid istoric şi artistic. București: Fundația pentru literatură și artă, Regele Carol II, 1938
- Dan Berindei, Sebastian Bonifaciu. București. Ghid turistic. București: Sport-Turism 1980
