= Niculae M. Popescu =

Niculae M. Popescu (February 10, 1881–February 11, 1963) was a Romanian theologian, historian and priest of the Romanian Orthodox Church.

Born in Dâmbovicioara, Dâmbovița County, his father was a priest. He attended Nifon Seminary in Bucharest from 1893 to 1901, and in 1902 took his high school graduating examination at Saint Sava National College. He attended two faculties at the University of Bucharest, theology and literature, obtaining degrees in 1907 and 1908. From 1910 to 1913, Popescu attended courses in history and Byzantine studies at the University of Vienna, taking a doctorate in history in 1913. He served as a deacon at Zamfira Monastery from 1908 to 1910, at the Romanian Orthodox chapel in Vienna during his time there and, from 1913 to 1920, at Bucharest's Cotroceni Monastery. Between 1919 and 1923, he directed the chancery for the Metropolis of Ungro-Wallachia. Ordained a priest, he served at two parishes: Schitul Măgureanu (1920 to 1926) and Bradu Boteanu (1926 to 1933). Popescu directed the Nifon seminary from 1923 to 1924, and from 1922 to 1946 headed the Romanian church history department in Bucharest's theology faculty, a post he secured upon Nicolae Iorga's recommendation. Elected a corresponding member of the Romanian Academy in 1920, he was elevated to titular status in 1923 and stripped of membership by the new communist regime in 1948. He was the academy's vice president from 1939 to 1943. He taught religion to once and future King Michael I of Romania from 1932 to 1940; the two remained close thereafter.

From 1923 to 1948, he belonged to the historic monuments commission, and served as general secretary in the Religious Affairs Ministry between 1931 and 1939. He took part in the Byzantinology congresses at Bucharest (1924), Belgrade (1927), Sofia (1934) and Rome (1936). From 1927, he presided over a choral society, organizing concerts at home and abroad. He published studies on church history and the history of Romanian culture, as well as monographs about various bishops and priests. Popescu's son Mihai, a theater actor, died in 1953; his wife Eufrosina followed in 1955. In 1960, he donated his personal library, numbering over 7,000 books, including rare titles and manuscripts, to the Romanian Patriarchate. He was buried at Bellu Cemetery. Aside from Iorga, his friends and correspondents included Tit Simedrea, Vasile Pârvan, Sextil Pușcariu, and Ioan Bianu.
