= Thracian language =

Extinct Indo-European language

Thracian
- Region: Bulgaria, European Turkey, parts of Southern Serbia, parts of the region of Macedonia (including Paeonia), regions in Northern Greece, parts of Romania, parts of Bithynia in Anatolia. Probably also spoken in parts of Dardania.
- Extinct: 6th century AD
- Language family: Indo-European: Daco-Thracian (?); Thracian
- Writing system: Greek

Language codes
- ISO 639-3: txh
- Glottolog: thra1250

Thracian (/ˈθreɪʃən/ THRAY-shən) is an extinct and poorly attested language, spoken in ancient times in Southeast Europe by the Thracians. The linguistic affinities of the Thracian language are poorly understood, but it is generally agreed that it was an Indo-European language.

The modern understanding of Thracian is built on a massive corpus of personal names (onomastics), place names, and a few deeply obscure inscriptions that have defied clear interpretation.

== Remnants of the Thracian language ==
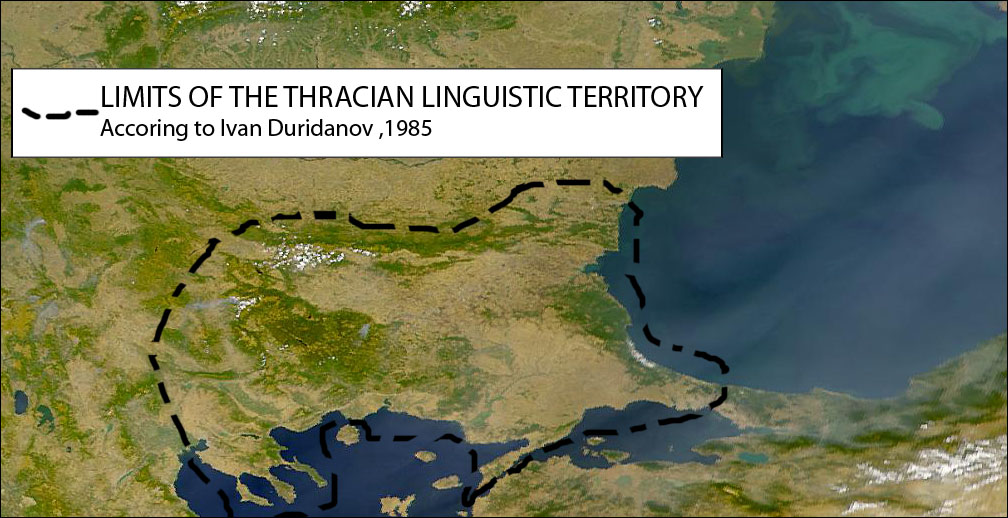
Limits of the (southern) Thracian linguistic territory according to Ivan Duridanov, 1985

Little is known for certain about the Thracian language, since no text has been satisfactorily deciphered. Some of the longer inscriptions may be Thracian in origin but they may simply reflect jumbles of names or magical formulas.

Enough Thracian lexical items have survived to show that Thracian was a member of the Indo-European language family.

Besides the aforementioned inscriptions, Thracian may be attested through personal names, toponyms, hydronyms, phytonyms, divine names, etc. and by a small number of words cited in Ancient Greek texts as being specifically Thracian.

There are 23 words mentioned by ancient sources considered explicitly of Thracian origin and known meaning. Of the words that are preserved in ancient glossaries, in particular by Hesychius, only three dozen can be considered "Thracian". However, Indo-European scholars have pointed out that "even the notion that what the ancients called "Thracian" was a single entity is unproven." The table below lists potential cognates from Indo-European languages, but most of them have not found general acceptance within Indo-European scholarship. Not all lexical items in Thracian are assumed to be from the Proto-Indo-European language, some non-IE lexical items in Thracian are to be expected.

Word	Meaning	Attested by	Cognates	Notes
ἄσα (asa)	colt's foot (Bessi)	Dioscorides	Lithuanian dialectal asỹs 'horse-tail, Equisetum', Latvian aši, ašas 'horse-tail, sedge, rush'	The etymology of both Baltic words is unclear and extra-Baltic cognates have yet to be established.
βόλινθος (bólinthos)	aurochs, European bison	Aristotle	Proto-Slavic *volъ ("ox"). Per Beekes, Pre-Greek.	See also Greek βοῦς 'cow', but Latv. govs ' id ' both < PIE *g^{w}ṓws. Proto-Slavic *vòlъ has no extra-Slavic cognates.
βρία (bría)	unfortified village	Hesychius of Alexandria, compare the toponyms Πολτυμβρία, Σηλυ(μ)μβρία, and Βρέα in Thrace.	Compared to Greek ῥίον (ríon; "peak, foothills") and Tocharian A ri, B riye ("town") as if < *urih₁-. Alternatively, compare Proto-Celtic *brix- ("hill").	Greek ῥίον has no clear etymology. The Tocharian lemmata may be related.
βρίζα (bríza)	rye	Galen	Perhaps of Eastern origin, compare Greek ὄρυζα, Sanskrit vrīhí- ("rice").	The 'rice' words in Greek and Sanskrit are Wanderwörter. The Greek word may be borrowed from an Eastern Iranian language.
βρυνχός (brynkhós)	kithara		Compared with Slavic *bręčati "to ring".	The word may be onomatopoetic in nature. Furthermore, there is a grave issue with the inscription, as Gk /ŋ/ is written with a gamma before a velar, i.e., this word should be written βρυγχός, which it is not.
βρῦτος (brŷtos)	beer of barley	many	Slavic "vriti" (to boil), Germanic *bruþa- ("broth"), Old Irish bruth ("glow"), Latin dē-frŭtum ("must boiled down"). (Note: Valdés (2017) cites other cognates to the root: Celtic deity Borvo and Latin ferveo "I boil" (from e-grade).)	
dinupula, si/nupyla	wild melon	Pseudo-Apuleius	Lithuanian šùnobuolas, lit. ("dog's apple"), or with Slavic *dynja ("melon"). Per Vladimir Georgiev, derived from *kun-ābōlo- or *kun-ābulo- 'hound's apple'.	Proto-Slavic *dyña (from earlier *kъdyña is most likely borrowed from Gk. κῠδώνῐον via Lat. cydōnia.
γέντον (génton)	meat	Herodian, Suda, Hesychius	Possibly descended from IE *gʷʰn̥tó- 'strike, kill', cf. Sanskrit hatá- 'hit, killed'	The adjective *gʷʰn̥tós in the zero-grade has an *-s in the nom.sg., whereas in Thracian the word ends in a nasal, which is a serious issue that requires morphological remodelling in Thracian for it to be posited as the starting point for Thracian γέντον. Furthermore, the e-grade vowel of the Thracian potential avatar remains to be explained as well if from an original PIE *gʷʰn̥tós.
καλαμίνδαρ (kalamíndar)	plane-tree (Edoni)	Hesychius		
κη̃μος (kêmos)	a kind of fruit with follicle	Photios I of Constantinople's Lexicon		
κτίσται (ktístai)	Ctistae	Strabo		
midne (in a Latin inscription, thus not written with Gk alphabet)	village	inscription from Rome	Latvian mītne 'a place of stay', Avestan maēϑana- 'dwelling'	
Πολτυμ(βρία) (poltym-bría)	board fence, a board tower		Old English speld 'wood, log'	The OE lemma is poorly understood and extra-Germanic cognates are few and far between. OE speld may have descended from a PIE root *(s)pley- which is poorly attested and does not seem to be a formal match to the Thracian term.
ῥομφαία (rhomphaía)	broadsword		Compared with Latin rumpō ("to rupture"), Bulgarian roféja, rufja (руфя), i.e. "thunderbolt" and the Albanian rrufeja as derivatives of that word. Slavic: Russian разрубать, Polish rąbać ("to hack", "to chop", "to slash"), Polish rębajło ("eager swordsman"), Serbo-Croatian rmpalija ("bruiser")	The Slavic terms here must come from a medial *-b^{h}-, whereas Lat. rumpō 'I break' must descend from a medial *-p- and therefore those words aren't even cognate with each other, let alone with the Thracian term.
σκάλμη (skálmē)	knife, sword	Sophocles, Julius Pollux, Marcus Aurelius, Hesychius, Photios' Lexicon	Albanian shkallmë ("sword"), Old Norse skolmr 'cleft'	The Albanian term is likely a secondary innovation. ON skolmr is unclear and has no extra-Germanic cognates; it is unlikely to be related to the Thracian term.
σκάρκη (skárkē)	a silver coin	Hesychius, Photios' Lexicon		
σπίνος (spínos)	'a kind of stone, which blazes when water touches it' (i.e. 'lime')	Aristotle	PIE *k̑witn̥os 'white, whitish', Greek τίτανος (Attic) and κίττανος (Doric) 'gypsum, chalk, lime'. Although from the same PIE root, Albanian shpâ(ni) 'lime, tartar' and Greek σπίνος 'lime' derive from a secondary origin as they were probably borrowed from Thracian due to phonetic reasons	
τορέλλη (toréllē)	a refrain of lament mourn song	Hesychius		
ζαλμός (zalmós)	animal hide	Porphyry of Tyre	Per Georgiev, derived from *kolmo-s. Related to Gothic hilms, German Helm and Old Iranian sárman 'protection'.	Thracian initial ζ- can either be related to PIE *ḱ (as in these 'cognates' and several below) or to *ǵ^{h}-/*g^{h}- as in the following entry, but not both. There does not exist an OIr word sárman, but a word śárman does exist in Sanskrit. However, Sanskrit ś- must go back to a PIE *ḱ-, not *k- as Georgiev states.
ζειρά (zeira)	long robe worn by Arabs and Thracians	Herodotus, Xenophon, Hesychius	Per Georgiev, related to Greek χείρ (kheir) and Phrygian ζειρ (zeir) 'hand'.	See above. The meaning of Phrygian ζειρα(ι) is unknown, not 'hand' as Georgiev believes.
ζελᾶ (zelâ), also ζῆλα (zêla), ζηλᾱς (zelās)	wine	many	Compared with Greek χάλις (khális; "unblended wine") and κάλιθος (kálithos; "wine")	See above.
ζετραία (zetraía)	pot	Julius Pollux	Per Georgiev, related to Greek χύτρα (khútra) 'pot'.	See above.
zibythides	the noble, most holy one	Hesychius	Lith. žibùtė ("shining")	

== Inscriptions ==
The following are the longest inscriptions preserved. The remaining ones are mostly single words or names on vessels and other artifacts. No translation has been accepted by the larger Indo-European community of scholars.

=== Ezerovo inscription ===
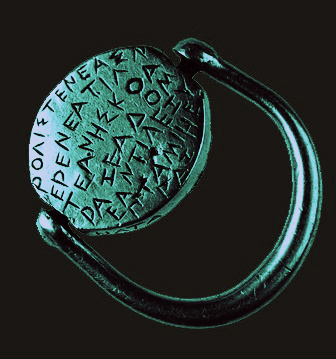
The Ring of Ezerovo, found in 1912

Only four Thracian inscriptions of any length have been found. The first is a gold ring found in 1912 in the village of Ezerovo (Plovdiv Province of Bulgaria); the ring was dated to the 5th century BC. The ring features an inscription in a Greek script consisting of 8 lines, the eighth of which is located on the rim of the rotating disk; it reads without any spaces between: ΡΟΛΙΣΤΕΝΕΑΣΝ / ΕΡΕΝΕΑΤΙΛ / ΤΕΑΝΗΣΚΟΑ / ΡΑΖΕΑΔΟΜ / ΕΑΝΤΙΛΕΖΥ / ΠΤΑΜΙΗΕ / ΡΑΖ // ΗΛΤΑ

Dimitar Dechev (Germanised as D. Detschew) separates the words and proposes a translation as follows:

ΡΟΛΙΣΤΕΝΕΑΣ ΝΕΡΕΝΕΑ ΤΙΛΤΕΑΝ ΗΣΚΟ ΑΡΑΖΕΑ ΔΟΜΕΑΝ ΤΙΛΕΖΥΠΤΑ ΜΙΗ ΕΡΑ ΖΗΛΤΑ
Rolisteneas Nerenea tiltean ēsko Arazea domean Tilezypta miē era zēlta
I am Rolisteneas, a descendant of Nereneas; Tilezypta, an Arazian woman, delivered me to the ground.

=== Kyolmen inscription ===
A second inscription, hitherto undeciphered, was found in 1965 near the village of Kyolmen, Varbitsa Municipality, dating to the sixth century BC. Written in a Greek alphabet variant, it is possibly a tomb stele inscription similar to the Phrygian ones; Peter A. Dimitrov's transcription thereof is:

ΙΛΑΣΝΛΕΤΕΔΝΛΕΔΝΕΝΙΔΑΚΑΤΡΟΣΟ
ΕΒΑ·ΡΟΖΕΣΑΣΝΗΝΕΤΕΣΑΙΓΕΚΟΑ
ΝΒΛΑΒΑΗΓΝ

i.e.

ilasnletednlednenidakatroso
eba·rozesasnēnetesaigekoa
nblabaēgn

=== Duvanlii inscription ===
A third inscription is again on a ring, found in Duvanlii, Kaloyanovo Municipality, next to the left hand of a skeleton. It dates to the 5th century BC. The ring has the image of a horseman with the inscription surrounding the image. It is only partly legible (16 out of the initial 21):

ΗΥΖΙΗ ..... ΔΕΛΕ / ΜΕΖΗΝΑΙ
ēuziē ..... dele / mezēnai

The word mezenai is interpreted to mean 'Horseman', and a cognate to Illyrian Menzanas (as in "Juppiter/Jove Menzanas" 'Juppiter of the foals' or 'Juppiter on a horse'); Albanian mëz 'foal'; Romanian mînz 'colt, foal'; Latin mannus 'small horse, pony'; Gaulish manduos 'pony' (as in tribe name Viromandui 'men who own ponies'). (Note: A similarly looking word Mandicae 'to Mandica' is attested in an inscription from Asturia. It has been suggested to mean the name of a goddess related to foals.)

=== Stele from Samothrace ===
A damaged stele was found while excavating the Sanctuary of Great Gods in Samothrace. The stele carries an inscription dating to the late 5th or 4th centuries BC. The last two lines of the inscription could belong to a Greek postscript but the rest is clearly non-Greek. The preserved letters of the inscription read as follows:

......... Ε / ..... ΛΕ / .... ΔΑΟΗΤΟ / ... ΥΕΛΑ / . ΕΒΛΟΣΕΗΟ / . ΡΑΙΑΝΕ / .. ΟΝ‧ΒΕΚΑ / .. ΟΛΕΙΤΡΑ / .. ΝΤΟΛΑ / .. ΕΨΕΝΤ / .. ΟΝΟΣ
......... e / ..... le / .... daoēto / .... uela / . ebloseēo / . paiane / .. on‧beka / .. oleitra / .. ntola / .. epsent / .. onos

=== Zone inscriptions ===
The largest corpus of inscriptions by far comes from the sanctuary of Apollo in Ancient Zone. After examining over 200 graffiti and short inscriptions on pottery fragments (potsherds) from the 6th and early 5th centuries BC, Claude Brixhe concluded (in 2006) that a Thracian language of these inscriptions shared much closer lexical and structural commonalities with ancient Greek and Phrygian than previous academic models had assumed. His opponents argue that, instead of witnessing an independent Paleo-Balkan language, the corpus reflects broken, heavily accent-marked, or poorly written Greek used by partially Hellenized natives, or a specialized regional trade jargon (a contact-pidgin).

== Geographic distribution ==
The Thracian language or languages were spoken in what is now Bulgaria, Romania, North Macedonia, Northern Greece, European Turkey and in parts of Bithynia (North-Western Asiatic Turkey).

=== Toponymy ===
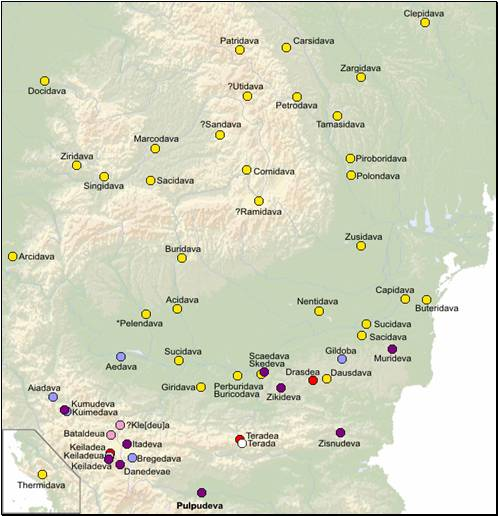
Onomastic range of some towns with the -dava ending

Many names of cities, towns, villages, and fortresses in and around ancient Thrace and Dacia were composed of an initial lexical element affixed to -dava, -daua, -deva, -deba, -daba, or -dova, which meant "city" or "town". Endings on more southern regions are exclusively -bria ("town, city"), -disza, -diza, -dizos ("fortress, walled settlement"), -para, -paron, -pera, -phara ("town, village"). Strabo translated -bria as polis, but that may not be accurate. Thracian -disza, -diza, and -dizos are derived from Proto-Indo-European *dheigh-, "to knead clay", hence to "make bricks", "build walls", "wall", "walls", and so on. These Thracian lexical items show a satemization of PIE *gh-. Cognates include Ancient Greek teichos ("wall, fort, fortified town", as in the town of Didymoteicho) and Avestan da?za ("wall").

It is suggested that the -dava endings are from the Dacian language, while the rest from the Thracian language. However -dava towns can be found as south as Sandanski and Plovdiv. Some -dava toponyms contain the same linguistic features as -diza toponyms, e.g. Pirodiza and Pirodava. The first written mention of the name "Dacians" is in Roman sources. Strabo specified that the Daci are the Getae, identified as a Thracian tribe. The Dacians, Getae and their kings were always considered as Thracians by the ancients (Dio Cassius, Trogus Pompeius, Appian, Strabo, Herodotus and Pliny the Elder) and were said to speak the same language. The Dacian language is considered a variety of the Thracian language. Such lexical differentiation -dava vs. -para, would be hardly enough evidence to separate Dacian from Thracian, thus they are classified as dialects. It is also possible that -dava and -bria mean two different things in the same language, rather than meaning the same thing in two different languages. Thus -bria could have been used for urbanized settlements, similar in scale and design to those of the "civilised" peoples like Greeks and Romans, whereas -dava could mean a settlement which is rural, being situated in the steppe-like part of the Thracian lands.

== Classification ==
Due to a paucity of evidence required to establish a linguistic connection, the Thracian language, in modern linguistic textbooks, is usually treated either as its own branch of Indo-European, or is grouped with Dacian, together forming a Daco-Thracian branch of IE. Older textbooks often grouped it also with Illyrian or Phrygian. The idea that Thracian was close to Phrygian is no longer popular and has mostly been discarded.

There is a fringe idea that Thraco-Dacian forms a branch of Indo-European along with Baltic. In 1992, Harvey Mayer suggested that Thracian (and Dacian) belonged to the Baltic branch of Indo-European, or at least is closer to Baltic than any other Indo-European branch. However, a Balto-Slavic linguistic unity is so overwhelmingly accepted by the Indo-European linguistic community that this hypothesis does not pass muster.

The Russian linguist Alexei S. Kassian considers the Indo-European identity of the Thracian language to be unverifiable and questions the parallels usually drawn between the known Thracian words and other Indo-European languages.

== Decline of the Thracians and their language ==
According to the 19th-century Greek educator Vlasios Skordelis, when Thracians were subjugated by Alexander the Great they finally assimilated to Greek culture and became as Greek as Spartans and Athenians, although he considered the Thracian language as a form of Greek. According to Crampton (1997) most Thracians were eventually Hellenized or Romanized, with the last remnants surviving in remote areas until the 5th century. According to Marinov (2015) the Thracians were likely completely Romanized and Hellenized after the last contemporary references to them of the 6th century.

Another author believes that the interior of Thrace was never Romanized or Hellenized (Trever, 1939). This was followed also by Slavonization. According to Weithmann (1978) when the Slavs migrated, they encountered only a very superficially Romanized Thracian and Dacian population, which had not strongly identified itself with Imperial Rome, while Greek and Roman populations (mostly soldiers, officials, merchants) abandoned the land or were killed. Because Pulpudeva survived as Plovdiv in Slavic languages, not under Philippopolis, some authors suggest that Thracian was not completely obliterated in the 7th century.

The point at which Thracian became extinct is a matter of dispute. It is generally accepted that Thracian was still in use in the 6th century AD: Antoninus of Piacenza wrote in 570 that there was a monastery in the Sinai, at which the monks spoke Greek, Latin, Syriac, Egyptian, and Bessian – a Thracian dialect.

== See also ==
- List of reconstructed Dacian words
- Thraco-Illyrian
- Paeonian language
- Ancient Macedonian language
- Thraco-Roman
- Paleo-Balkan languages
- Proto-Albanian language
- Proto-Balto-Slavic language
- Proto-Greek language

== General references ==
- Beekes, Robert S. P. (2009). Etymological Dictionary of Greek. Brill Academic Publishers. ISBN 978-90-04-17418-4.
- Brixhe, Claude (2018). "XVI Languages of fragmentary attestation, 104. Thracian". In Klein, Jared; Joseph, Brian; Fritz, Matthias (eds.). Handbook of Comparative and Historical Indo-European Linguistics. De Gruyter. pp. 1850–1854.
