= Anna Avramea =

Greek researcher, geographer, and Byzantinist

- Born: Anna Katsantoni; 7 September 1934; Komotini, Greece
- Died: 2008 (aged 73–74)

Academic background
- Education: National and Kapodistrian University of Athens; École Pratique des Hautes Études; Collège de France
- Thesis: Byzantine Thessaly until 1204: A Contribution to Historical Geography

Academic work
- Discipline: historical geography Byzantine studies
- Institutions: Panteion University; University of Crete

Anna Avramea, also known as Anna Katsantoni, (in Modern Greek: Άννα Αβραμέα (Ánna Avraméa) or Άννα Κατσαντώνη (Ánna Katsantóni)), (7 September 1934, in Komotini – 2008), was a Greek researcher, geographer, and Byzantinist.

== Biography ==
She was born on 7 September 1934, in Komotini. Her birth name was Katsantoni. Avramea attended a girls' high school in Athens, then enrolled at the National and Kapodistrian University of Athens, where she studied history and archaeology. She graduated from the university in 1957, before going to France, to Paris, to continue her studies at the École Pratique des Hautes Études (EPHE) under the direction of Paul Lemerle in historical geography and at the Collège de France.

The researcher then taught at Panteion University from 1964 to 1969, before being dismissed under the Greek junta. She then completed her thesis, titled "Byzantine Thessaly until 1204: A Contribution to Historical Geography", and began teaching at the University of Crete, a position she held until her retirement in 2002, when she became professor emeritus of the university. She also married Paul Avrameas, whose name she took. Anna Avramea had a particular interest in Byzantine and Ottoman Thessaly but studied Byzantine Greece extensively, from the Early Middle Ages. In 1999, she participated in the eighteenth international conference on cartography in Athens. She also focused on figures from disadvantaged classes and the archaeological traces left by these classes.

She died in 2008, and her husband fulfilled her last wishes by donating her archives and library to the University of Crete.
