= Bucur (surname) =

Bucur is a Romanian surname. Notable people with the surname include:

- Alina Bucur, Romanian-born American mathematician
- Dragoș Bucur (born 1977), Romanian actor
- Florica Bucur (born 1959), Romanian rower
- Gheorghe Bucur (born 1980), Romanian football player
- Maria Bucur (born 1968), Romanian historian
- Olimpiu Bucur (born 1989), Romanian footballer
