= William Wilkinson (diplomat) =

British diplomat, writer (died 1836)

William Wilkinson (died 1836) was an Englishman appointed as the Levant Company's representative in Bucharest in October 1813; His agency was terminated in 1816. Despite support for his candidacy from Prince Ioan Caragea, the then hospodar of Wallachia, Wilkinson failed in his attempt to secure appointment as British Consul in Bucharest in 1818. He wrote a book An Account of the Principalities of Wallachia and Moldavia: With Various Political Observations Relating to Them (1820). It was one of the books on which Bram Stoker took notes before writing Dracula, and the Romanian name Dracula was taken from it.

Wilkinson was later posted to Syros, in 1829, by the Levant Company. He died in Paris on 23 August 1836.
