= Sorin Paliga =

Romanian linguist and politician

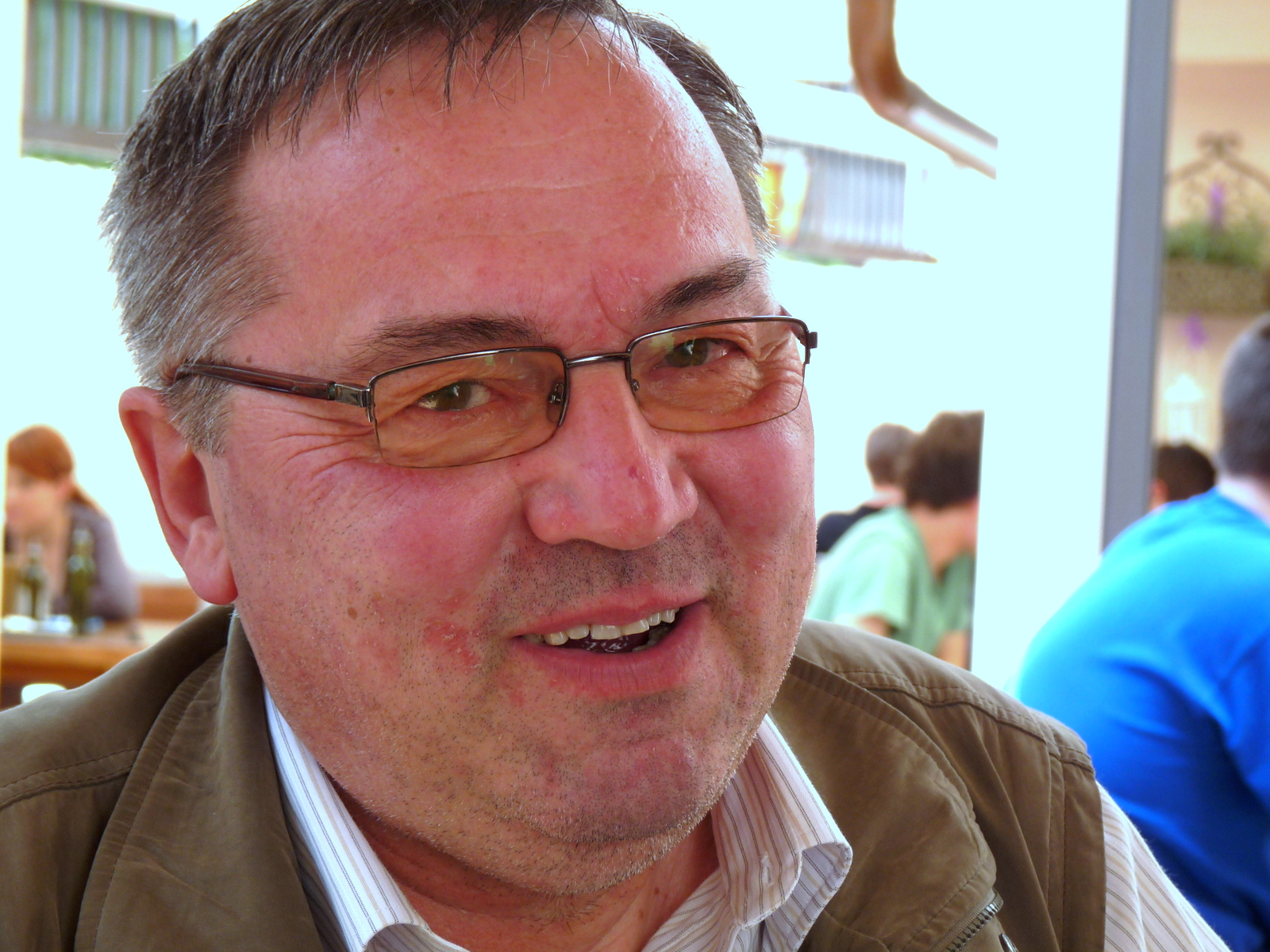
- Born: Viorel-Sorin Paliga; 21 June 1956 (age 70); Braniștea, Dâmbovița County, Romania
- Occupations: Linguist and politician
- Spouse: Rodica Paliga

Academic background
- Education: University of Bucharest

Academic work
- Institutions: University of Bucharest
- Main interests: Eastern Romance languages, South Slavic languages, pre-Indo-European languages

Sorin Paliga (born Viorel-Sorin Paliga on 21 June 1956 in Braniștea, Dâmbovița County, Romania) is a Romanian linguist and politician. He is a university professor at the University of Bucharest. As a politician, he was the former mayor of Sector 3 of Bucharest from June 1996 to June 2000, and was affiliated with the National Liberal Party (PNL).

== Research interests ==
Paliga's main research interests include the influence of Dacian on Romanian, language contact, and Indo-European philology.

Paliga is a proponent of N. D. Andreev's Boreal languages theory, which links the Indo-European, Uralic, and Altaic language families.

== Life ==
Paliga studied Czech and English at the University of Bucharest. He received his doctorate in 1998 by completing his dissertation on Roman and pre-Roman influences in South Slavic languages. Since 2001 he teaches Czech and comparative grammar of the Slavic Languages at the University of Bucharest.

Married to Rodica Paliga in 1985, a teacher of Latin and French, they have 3 children.

== Selected works by Sorin Paliga ==
=== Books ===
- Thracian and Pre-Thracian Studies (1999)
- Toponimia slavă și preslavă în sud- estul european. Introducere în studiul toponimiei slave arhaice (2003)
- Mitologia slavilor (2006)
- Introducere în studiul comparativ al limbilor slave (2012)
- Influențe romane și preromane în limbile slave de sud （2013）
- Morfologia limbii cehe, partea a II- a. Sfera nominală (2014)
- An Etymological Dictionary of the Romanian Language (2024)
