= Dacia =

Ancient kingdom in Southeastern Europe (168 BC – 106 AD)

Dacian Kingdom
- c. 168 BC – 106 AD
- Dacian draco

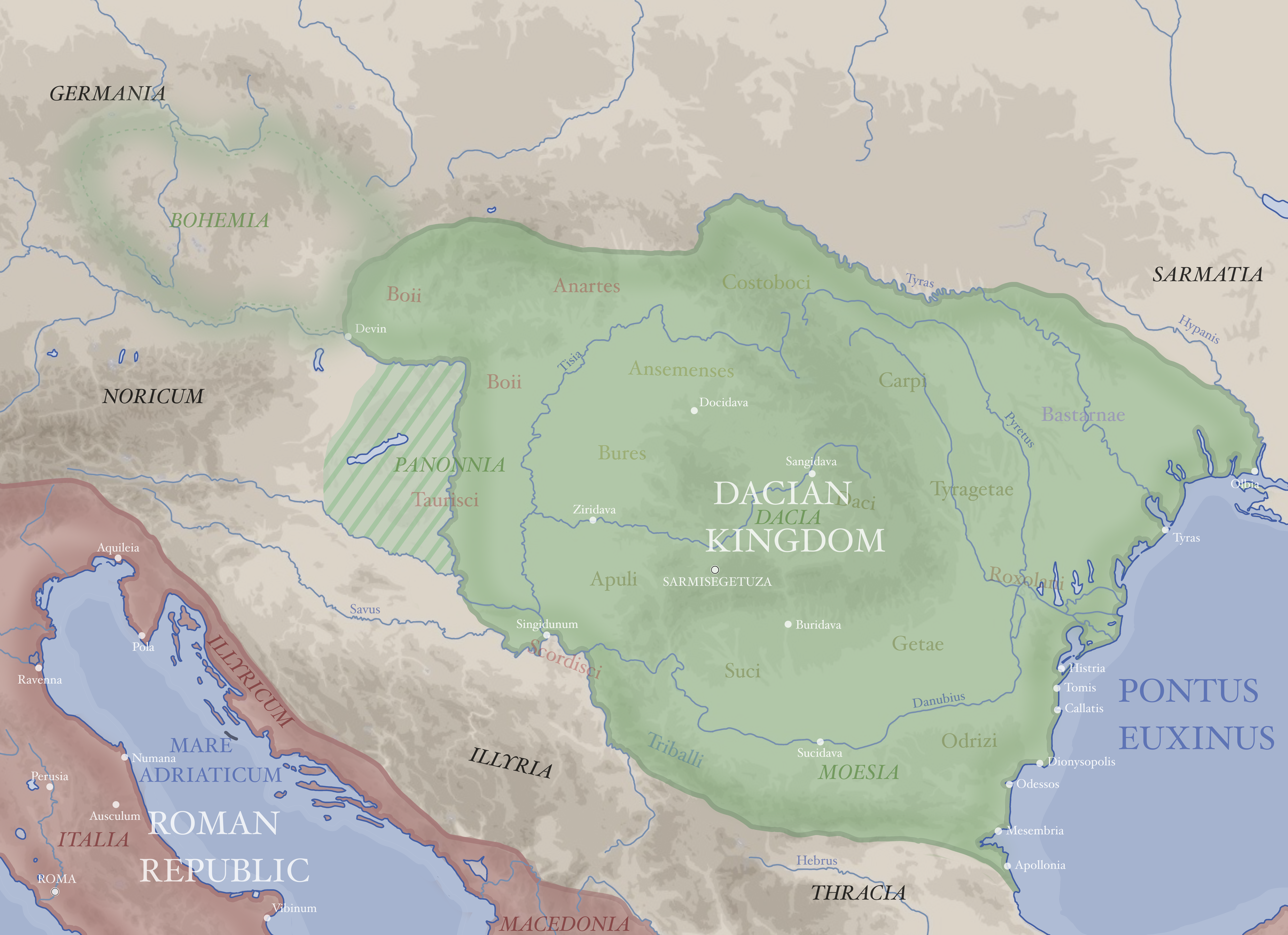
- Dacia at its greatest territorial extent under Burebista c. 55–44 BC
- Capital: Sarmizegetusa; 45.7°N 26.5°E
- Common languages: Dacian
- Religion: Thracian religion, Zamolxism
- Demonym: Dacian
- Government: Monarchy
- King
  - early 2nd century BC: Rubobostes
  - first half of the 2nd century BC: Oroles
  - 82–44 BC: Burebista
  - 44–27 BC: Deceneus
  - 27 BC – 29 AD: Comosicus
  - 29–69 AD: Scorilo
  - 69–87 AD: Duras
  - 87–106 AD: Decebalus
- Historical era: Classical antiquity
  - Established: c. 168 BC
  - Domitian's Dacian War: 84–88 AD
  - Trajan's Dacian Wars: 101–106 AD
  - Disestablished: 106 AD

Population
  - c. 44 BC estimate: c. 1,500,000–2,000,000
  - 106 AD: c. 650,000–1,200,000
- Currency: Koson
Preceded by
Dacians
Getae
Thracians
Succeeded by
Roman Dacia
Free Dacians
- Today part of: Romania; Moldova; Ukraine; Slovakia; Czech Republic; Poland; Hungary; Serbia; Bulgaria

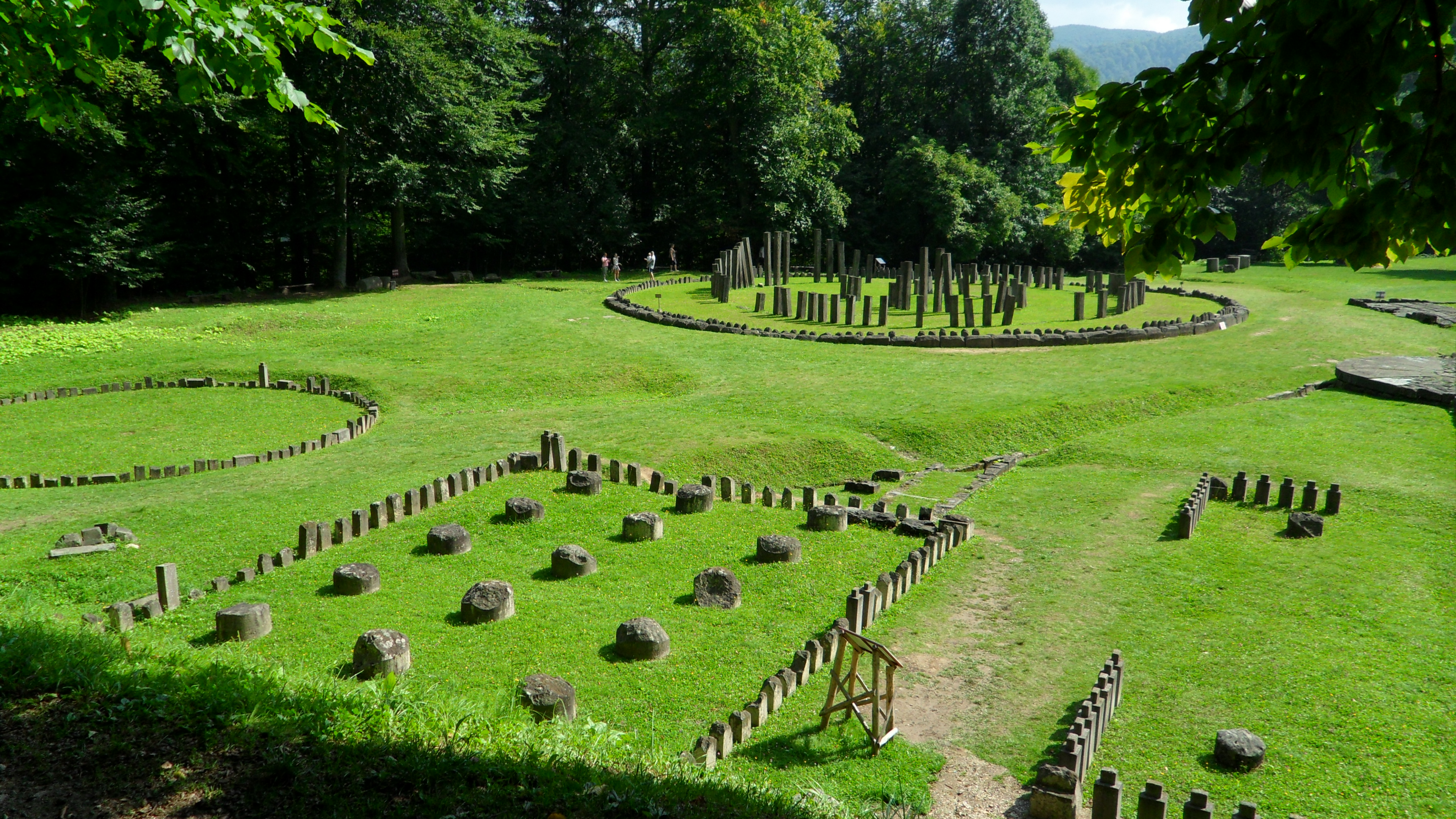
A section of the Sarmizegetusa ruins.

Dacia (/ˈdeɪʃə/ DAY-shə; Latin: [ˈdaːki.a]; Ancient Greek: Δακία) was the land inhabited by the Dacians, its core in Transylvania, stretching to the Danube in the south, the Black Sea in the east, and the Tisza in the west. The Carpathian Mountains were located in the middle of Dacia. It thus roughly corresponds to present-day Romania, as well as parts of Moldova, Bulgaria, Serbia, Hungary, Slovakia, Czech Republic, Poland and Ukraine.

A Dacian kingdom that united the Dacians and the Getae was formed under the rule of Burebista in 82 BC and lasted until the Roman conquest in AD 106. As a result of the wars with the Roman Empire, after the conquest of Dacia, the population was dispersed, and the capital city, Sarmizegetusa Regia, was destroyed by the Romans. However, the Romans built a settlement bearing the same name, Ulpia Traiana Sarmizegetuza, 40 km away, to serve as the capital of the newly established Roman province of Dacia. A group of "Free Dacians" may have remained outside the Roman Empire in the territory of modern-day Northern Romania until the start of the Migration Period.

== Nomenclature ==
The Dacians are first mentioned in the writings of the Ancient Greeks, in Herodotus (Histories Book IV XCIII: "[Getae] the noblest as well as the most just of all the Thracian tribes") and Thucydides (Peloponnesian Wars, Book II: "[Getae] border on the Scythians and are armed in the same manner, being all mounted archers").

== Geographical history ==
The territorial evolution of the Dacian tribes and kingdoms until the Roman conquest, according to ancient sources.

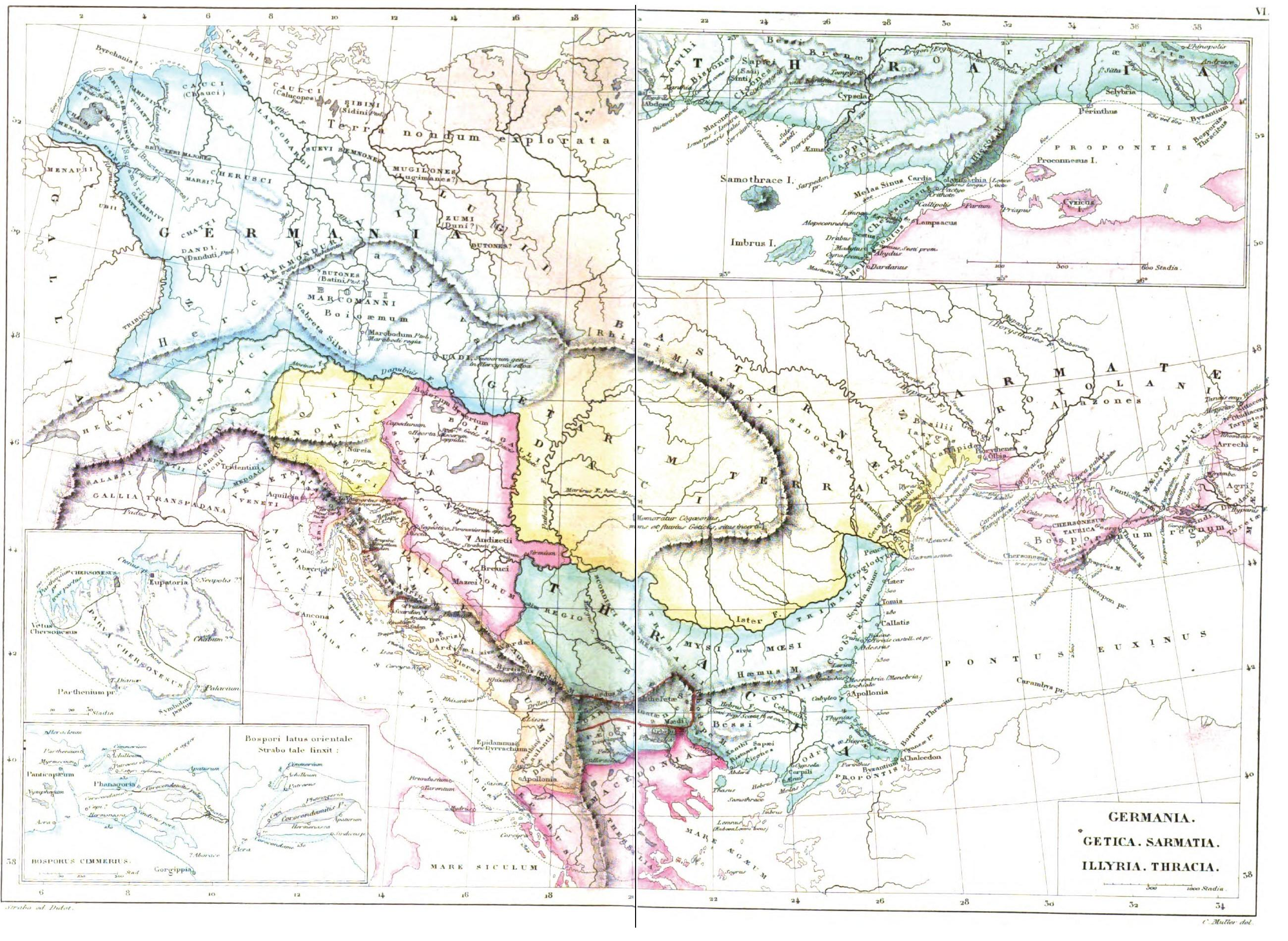
Dacia cf. Strabo (c. 20 AD)

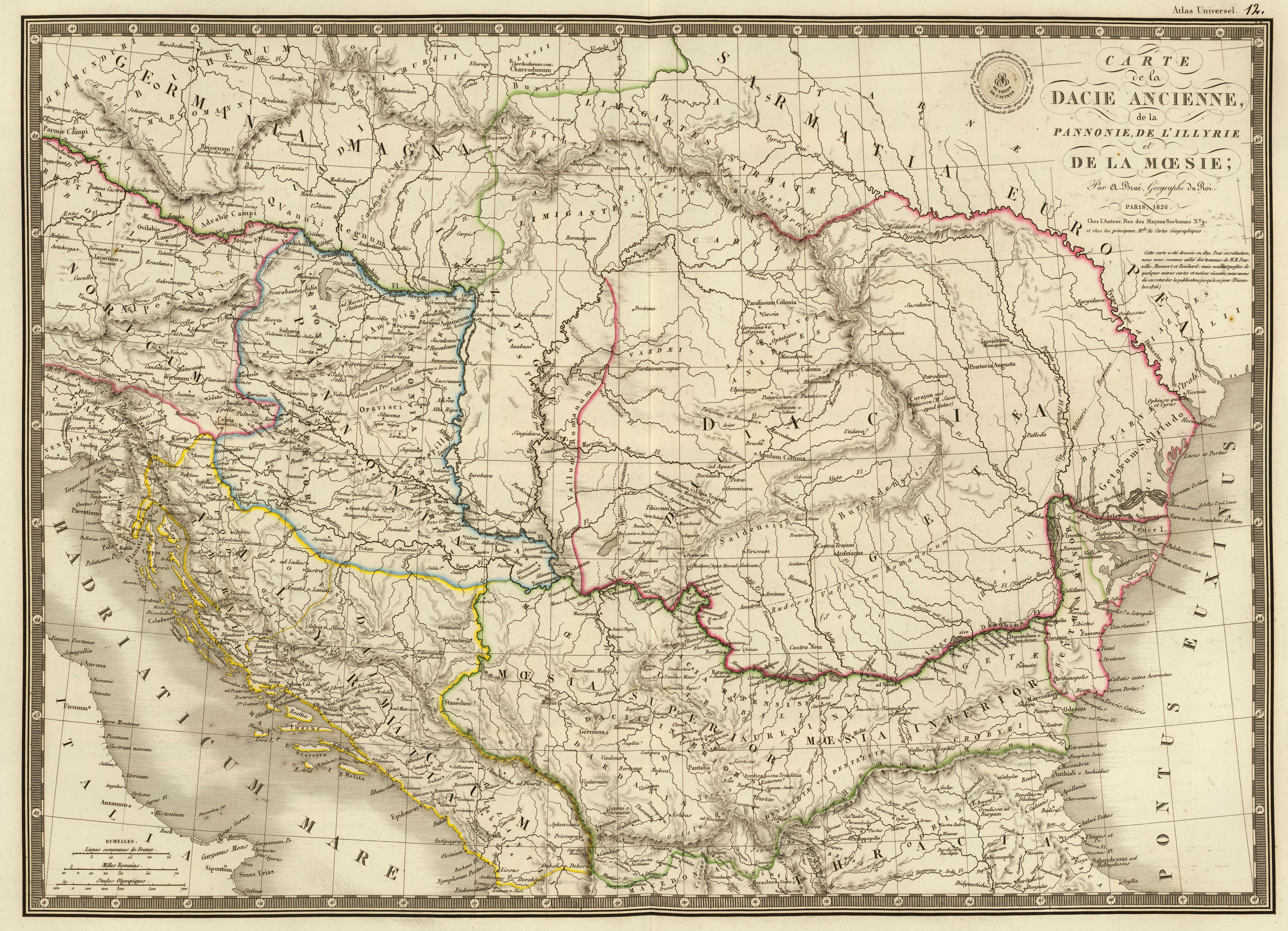
The map of Dacia by Brue Adrien Hubert (1826)

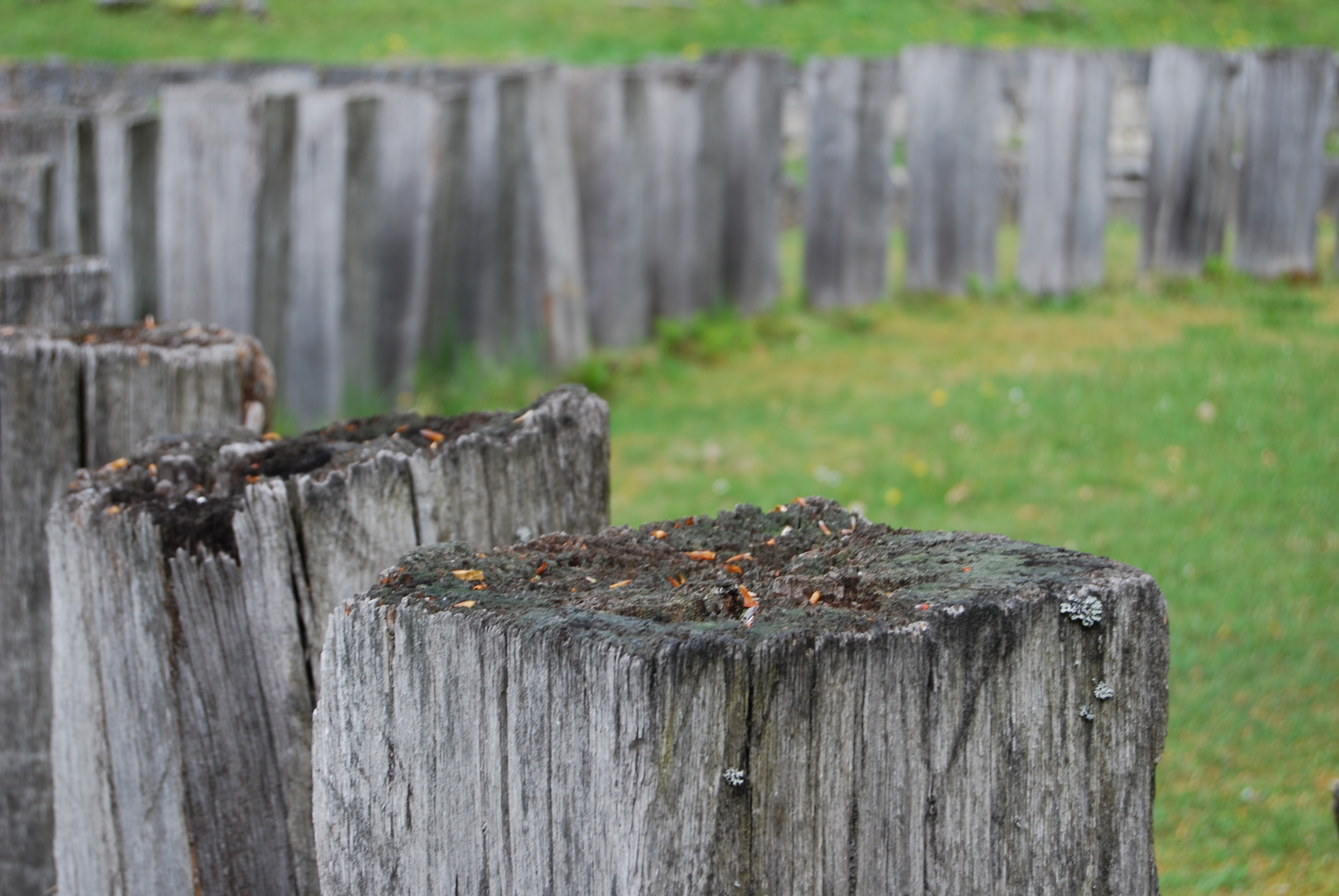
View of the sanctuary from Dacians' capital Sarmizegetusa Regia

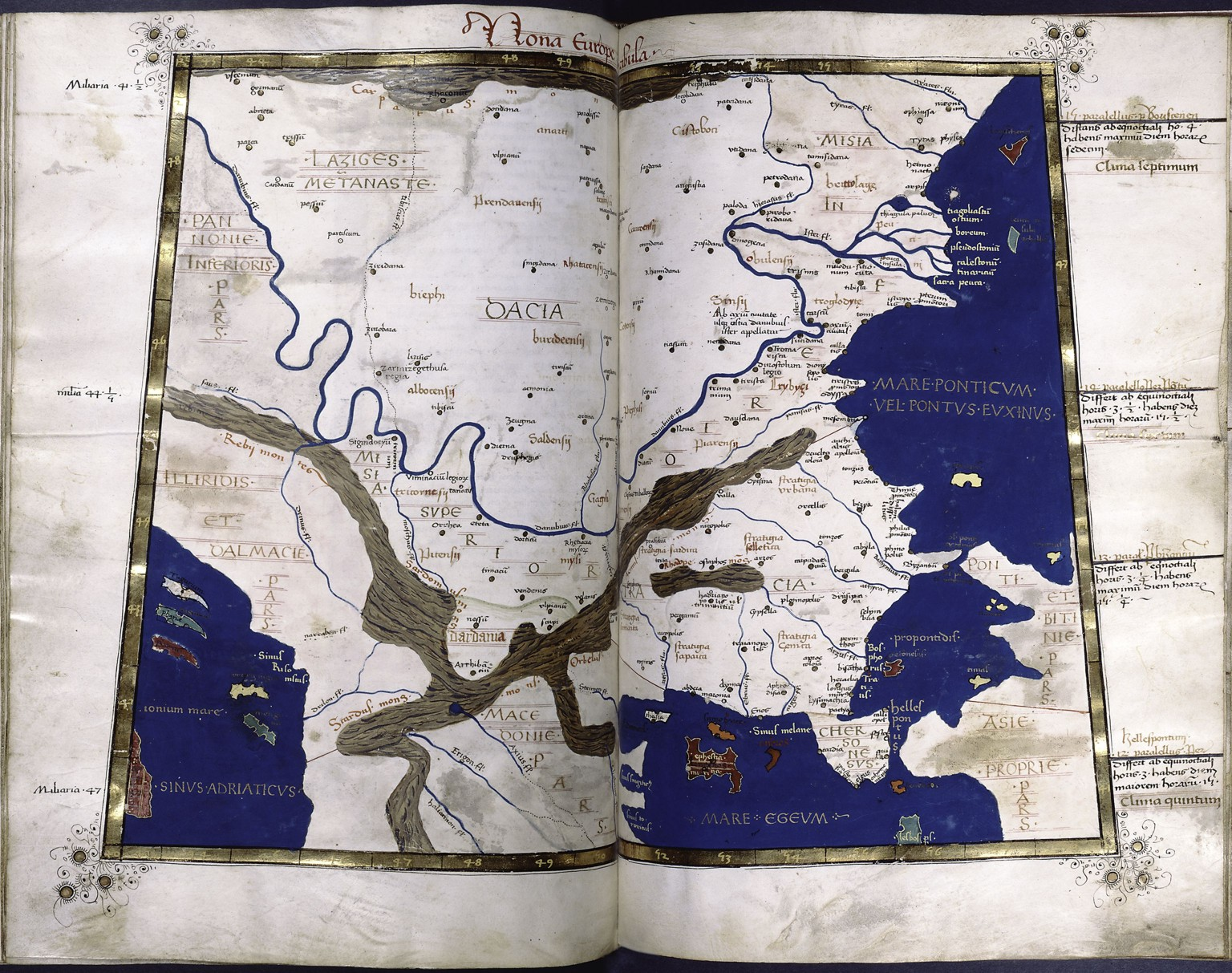
Dacia map cf. Ptolemy (2nd century AD)

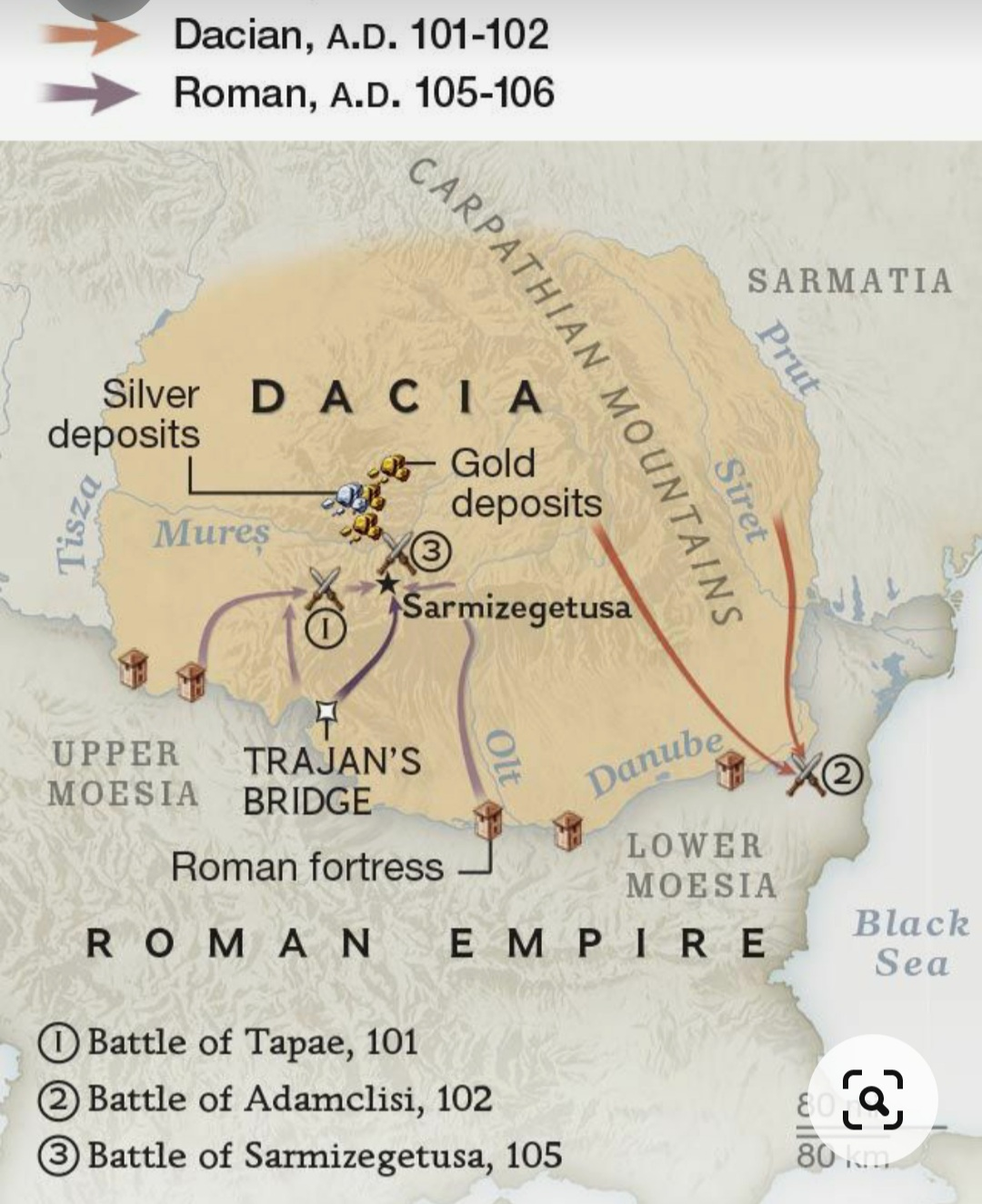
Dacia after 100 AD

The extent and location of Dacia varied in its three distinct historical periods (see below):

=== 1st century BC ===
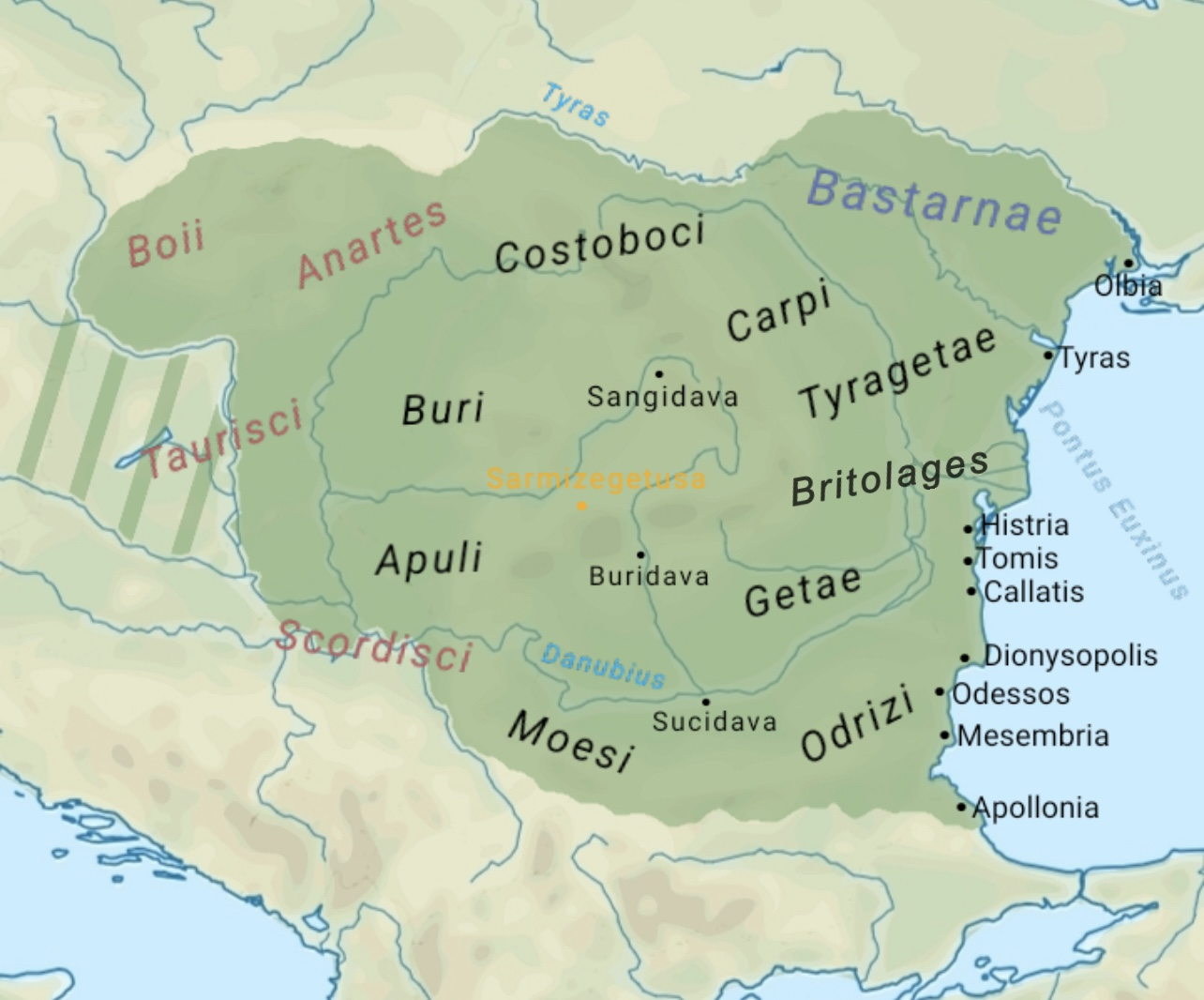
The biggest territorial expansion of the Dacian kingdom during Burebista according to Strabo.

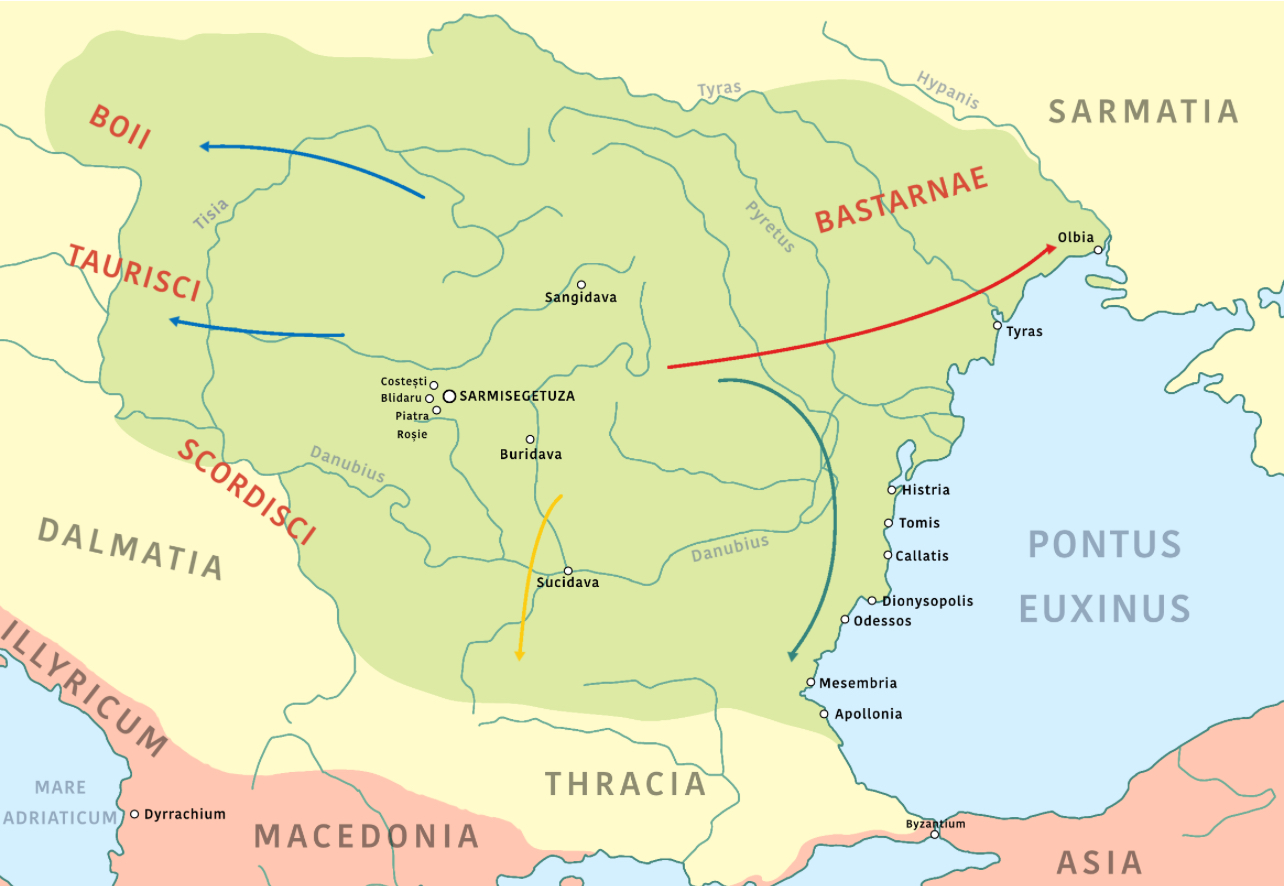
• Blue: The conquest of the Boii and Taurisci 61–59 BC • Yellow: Expedition south of the Danube c. 48 BC • Green: Conquest of the Greek colonies from the Black Sea coast from Histria to Apollonia 55 BC • Red: Conquest of the Greek colonies of Tyras and Olbia 55 BC

The Dacia of King Burebista (82–44 BC) stretched from the Black Sea to the river Tisza. During that period, the Getae and Dacians conquered a wider territory and Dacia extended from the Middle Danube to the Black Sea littoral (between Apollonia and Pontic Olbia) and from the Northern Carpathians to the Balkan Mountains. After Burebista's death in 44 BC, Dacia plunged into internal strife, resembling a civil war, as his unified kingdom split into several rival states. The constant power struggle weakened Dacia, but the Dacians remained a significant force, frequently making incursions into Roman territory. Stability was only restored when Duras and later Decebalus managed to reunite the kingdom.

=== 1st century AD ===
Strabo, in his Geography written around AD 20, says:

As for the southern part of Germany beyond the Albis, the portion which is just contiguous to that river is occupied by the Suevi; then immediately adjoining this is the land of the Getae, which, though narrow at first, stretching as it does along the Ister [Danube] on its southern side and on the opposite side along the mountain-side of the Hercynian Forest (for the land of the Getae also embraces a part of the mountains), afterwards broadens out towards the north as far as the Tyregetae; but I cannot tell the precise boundaries

On this basis, Lengyel and Radan (1980), Hoddinott (1981) and Mountain (1998) consider that the Geto-Dacians inhabited both sides of the Tisza river prior to the rise of the Celtic Boii. The hold of the Dacians between the Danube and the Tisza was tenuous. However, the archaeologist Parducz argued for a Dacian presence west of the Tisza dating from the time of Burebista. According to Tacitus (AD 56–117) Dacians bordered Germania in the south-east, while Sarmatians bordered it in the east.Although Strabo and Caesar notes that the Dacians reached the Hercynian Forest, Germania and beyond, Strabo still indicates their borders as the middle Danube and the northwestern Carpathians. This suggests that, while they exerted influence over more distant regions, they did not formally annex them. This also helps explain why some maps depict regions such as Bohemia or Pannonia as falling under Dacian territory or influence. However, most academic maps concentrate on formally annexed areas, as regions of temporary control or mere influence are inherently imprecise and difficult to define.

In the 1st century AD, the Iazyges settled west of Dacia, on the plain between the Danube and the Tisza rivers, according to scholars’ interpretation of Pliny text: “The higher parts between the Danube and the Hercynian Forest, as far as the winter quarters of Pannonia at Carnuntum, and the plains and level country of the German frontiers, are occupied by the Sarmatian Iazyges, while the Dacians whom they have driven out hold the mountains and forests as far as the river Tisza.”

=== 2nd century AD ===
Starting with AD 85, Dacia was once again reunified under King Decebalus. Following an incursion into Roman Moesia, which resulted in the death of its governor, Gaius Oppius Sabinus, a series of conflicts between the Romans and Dacians ensued. Although the Romans gained a major strategic victory at Tapae in AD 88, Emperor Domitian offered the Dacians favourable terms, in exchange for which Roman suzerainty was recognised. However, Emperor Trajan restarted the conflicts in AD 101-102 and then again in AD 105–106, which ended with the annexation of most of Dacia and its reorganisation as a Roman Province, Dacia Felix.

Written a few decades after Emperor Trajan's Roman conquest of parts of Dacia in AD 105–106, Ptolemy's Geographia included the boundaries of Dacia. According to the scholars' interpretation of Ptolemy (Hrushevskyi 1997, Bunbury 1879, Mocsy 1974, Bărbulescu 2005) Dacia was the region between the rivers Tisza, Danube, upper Dniester, and Siret. Mainstream historians accept this interpretation: Avery (1972) Berenger (1994) Fol (1996) Mountain (1998), Waldman Mason (2006).

Ptolemy also provided a couple of Dacian toponyms in south Poland in the Upper Vistula (Polish: Wisla) river basin: Susudava and Setidava (with a manuscript variant Getidava). This could have been an "echo" of Burebista's expansion. It seems that this northern expansion of the Dacian language, as far as the Vistula river, lasted until AD 170–180 when the migration of the Vandal Hasdingi pushed out this northern Dacian group. This Dacian group, possibly the Costoboci/Lipița culture, is associated by Gudmund Schütte with towns having the specific Dacian language ending "dava" i.e. Setidava.

After the Marcomannic Wars (AD 166–180), Dacian groups from outside Roman Dacia had been set in motion. So too were the 12,000 Dacians "from the neighbourhood of Roman Dacia sent away from their own country". Their native country could have been the Upper Tisa region, but other places cannot be excluded.

The later Roman province Dacia Aureliana, was organized inside former Moesia Superior after the retreat of the Roman army from Dacia, during the reign of emperor Aurelian during AD 271–275. It was reorganized as Dacia Ripensis (as a military province) and Dacia Mediterranea (as a civil province).

== Cities ==
Ptolemy gives a list of 43 names of towns in Dacia, out of which arguably 33 were of Dacian origin. Most of the latter included the added suffix "dava" (meaning settlement, village). But, other Dacian names from his list lack the suffix (e.g. Zarmisegethusa regia = Zermizirga). In addition, nine other names of Dacian origin seem to have been Latinised.

The cities of the Dacians were known as -dava, -deva, -δαυα ("-dawa" or "-dava", Anc. Gk.), -δεβα ("-deva", Byz. Gk.) or -δαβα ("-dava", Byz. Gk.), etc. .

1. In Dacia: Acidava, Argedava, Buridava, Dokidava, Carsidava, Clepidava, Cumidava, Marcodava, Netindava, Patridava, Pelendava, *Perburidava, Petrodaua, Piroboridaua, Rhamidaua, Rusidava, Sacidava, Sangidava, Setidava, Singidava, Tamasidava, Utidava, Zargidava, Ziridava, Sucidava – 26 names altogether.
2. In Lower Moesia (the present Northern Bulgaria) and Scythia minor (Dobrudja): Aedeba, *Buteridava, *Giridava, Dausadava, Kapidaua, Murideba, Sacidava, Scaidava (Skedeba), Sagadava, Sukidaua (Sucidava) – 10 names in total.
3. In Upper Moesia (the districts of Nish, Sofia, and partly Kjustendil): Aiadaba, Bregedaba, Danedebai, Desudaba, Itadeba, Kuimedaba, Zisnudeba – seven names in total.

Gil-doba, a village in Thracia, of unknown location.

Thermi-daua, a town in Dalmatia. Probably a Grecized form of *Germidava.

Pulpu-deva, (Phillipopolis) today Plovdiv in Bulgaria.

== Political entities ==
=== Rubobostes ===
Geto-Dacians inhabited both sides of the Tisa river prior to the rise of the Celtic Boii and again after the latter were defeated by the Dacians under the king Burebista. It seems likely that the Dacian state arose as a tribal confederacy, which was united only by charismatic leadership in military-political and ideological-religious domains. At the beginning of the 2nd century BC, under the rule of Rubobostes, a Dacian king in modern Transylvania, Dacian power in the Carpathian basin increased after they defeated the Celts, who previously held power in the region.

=== Oroles ===
A kingdom of Dacia also existed as early as the first half of the 2nd century BC under King Oroles. Conflicts with the Bastarnae and the Romans (112–109 BC, 74 BC), against whom they had assisted the Scordisci and Dardani, greatly weakened the resources of the Dacians.

=== Burebista ===
Burebista (Boerebista), a contemporary of Julius Caesar, ruled Geto-Dacian tribes between 82 BC and 44 BC. He thoroughly reorganised the army and attempted to raise the moral standard and obedience of the people by persuading them to cut their vines and give up drinking wine. During his reign, the Dacian Kingdom expanded to its maximum extent. The Bastarnae and Boii were conquered, and even the Greek towns of Olbia and Apollonia on the Black Sea (Pontus Euxinus) recognized Burebista's authority. In 53 BC, Caesar stated that the Dacian territory was on the eastern border of the Hercynian Forest.

Burebista suppressed the indigenous minting of coinages by four major tribal groups, adopting imported or copied Roman denarii as a monetary standard. During his reign, Burebista transferred Geto-Dacians capital from Argedava to Sarmizegetusa Regia. For at least one and a half centuries, Sarmizegetusa was the Dacians' capital and reached its peak under King Decebalus. The Dacians appeared so formidable that Caesar contemplated an expedition against them, which his death in 44 BC prevented. In the same year, Burebista was murdered, and the kingdom was divided into four (later five) parts under separate rulers.

=== Cotiso ===
One of these entities was Cotiso's state, to whom Augustus betrothed his own five-year-old daughter Julia. He is well known from the line in Horace (Occidit Daci Cotisonis agmen, Odes, III. 8. 18).

The Dacians are often mentioned under Augustus, according to whom they were compelled to recognize Roman supremacy. However they were by no means subdued, and in later times to maintain their independence they seized every opportunity to cross the frozen Danube during the winter and ravaging the Roman cities in the province of Moesia, which was under Roman occupation.

Strabo testified: "although the Getae and Daci once attained to very great power, so that they actually could send forth an expedition of two hundred thousand men, they now find themselves reduced to as few as forty thousand, and they have come close to the point of yielding obedience to the Romans, though as yet they are not absolutely submissive, because of the hopes which they base on the Germans, who are enemies to the Romans."

In fact, this occurred because Burebista's empire split after his death into four and later five smaller states, as Strabo explains, "only recently, when Augustus Caesar sent an expedition against them, the number of parts into which the empire had been divided was five, though at the time of the insurrection it had been four. Such divisions, to be sure, are only temporary and vary with the times".

=== Decebalus ===
Decebalus ruled the Dacians between AD 87 and 106. The frontiers of Decebal's Dacia were marked by the Tisa River to the west, by the trans-Carpathians to the north and by the Dniester River to the east. His name translates into "strong as ten men".

== Roman conquest ==
When Trajan turned his attention to Dacia, it had been on the Roman agenda since before the days of Julius Caesar when a Roman army had been beaten at the Battle of Histria.

From AD 85 to 89, the Dacians under Decebalus were engaged in two wars with the Romans.

In AD 85, the Dacians had swarmed over the Danube and pillaged Moesia. In AD 87, the Roman troops sent by the Emperor Domitian against them under Cornelius Fuscus, were defeated and Cornelius Fuscus was killed by the Dacians by authority of their ruler, Diurpaneus. After this victory, Diurpaneus took the name of Decebalus, but the Romans were victorious in the Battle of Tapae in AD 88 and a truce was drawn up. The next year, AD 88, new Roman troops under Tettius Julianus, gained a significant advantage, but were obligated to make peace following the defeat of Domitian by the Marcomanni, leaving the Dacians effectively independent. Decebalus was given the status of "king client to Rome", receiving military instructors, craftsmen and money from Rome. To Rome, Domitian brought Italian peasants in Dacian clothing because he couldn't take slaves in the war.

To increase the glory of his reign, restore the finances of Rome, and end a treaty perceived as humiliating, Trajan resolved on the conquest of Dacia, the capture of the famous Treasure of Decebalus, and control over the Dacian gold mines of Transylvania. The result of his first campaign (101–102) was the siege of the Dacian capital Sarmizegethusa and the occupation of part of the country. Emperor Trajan recommenced hostilities against Dacia and, following an uncertain number of battles, and with Trajan's troops pressing towards the Dacian capital Sarmizegethusa, Decebalus once more sought terms.

Decebalus rebuilt his power over the following years and attacked Roman garrisons again in AD 105. In response Trajan again marched into Dacia, attacking the Dacian capital in the Siege of Sarmizegethusa, and razing it to the ground; the defeated Dacian king Decebalus committed suicide to avoid capture. With part of Dacia quelled as the Roman province Dacia Traiana. Trajan subsequently invaded the Parthian empire to the east. His conquests brought the Roman Empire to its greatest extent. Rome's borders in the east were governed indirectly in this period, through a system of client states, which led to less direct campaigning than in the west.

Some of the history of the war is given by Cassius Dio. Trajan erected the Column of Trajan in Rome to commemorate his victory.

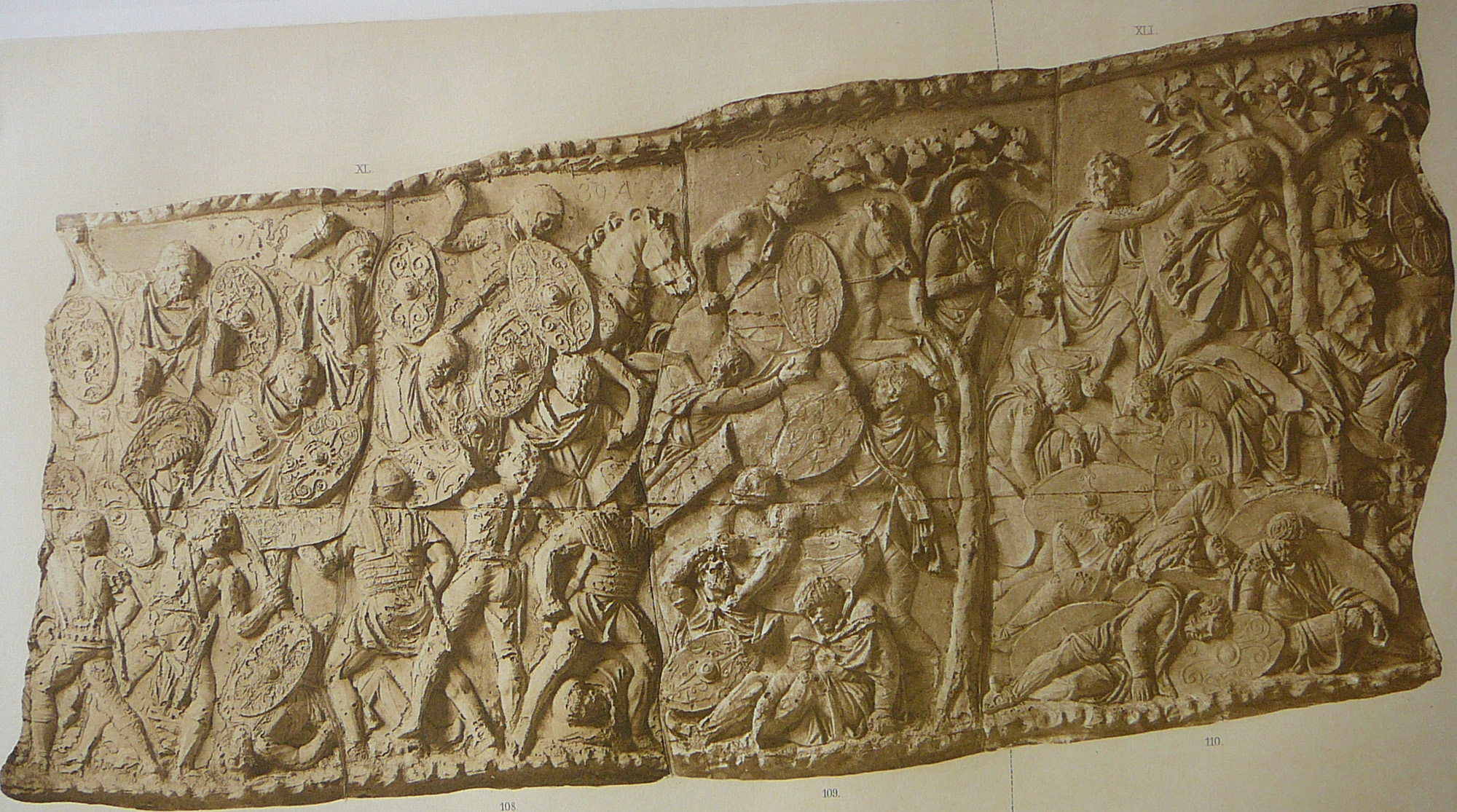
Fiery battle scene between the Roman and Dacian armies, Trajan's Column, Rome

Roman Dacia and Moesia Inferior

=== Provincial history ===
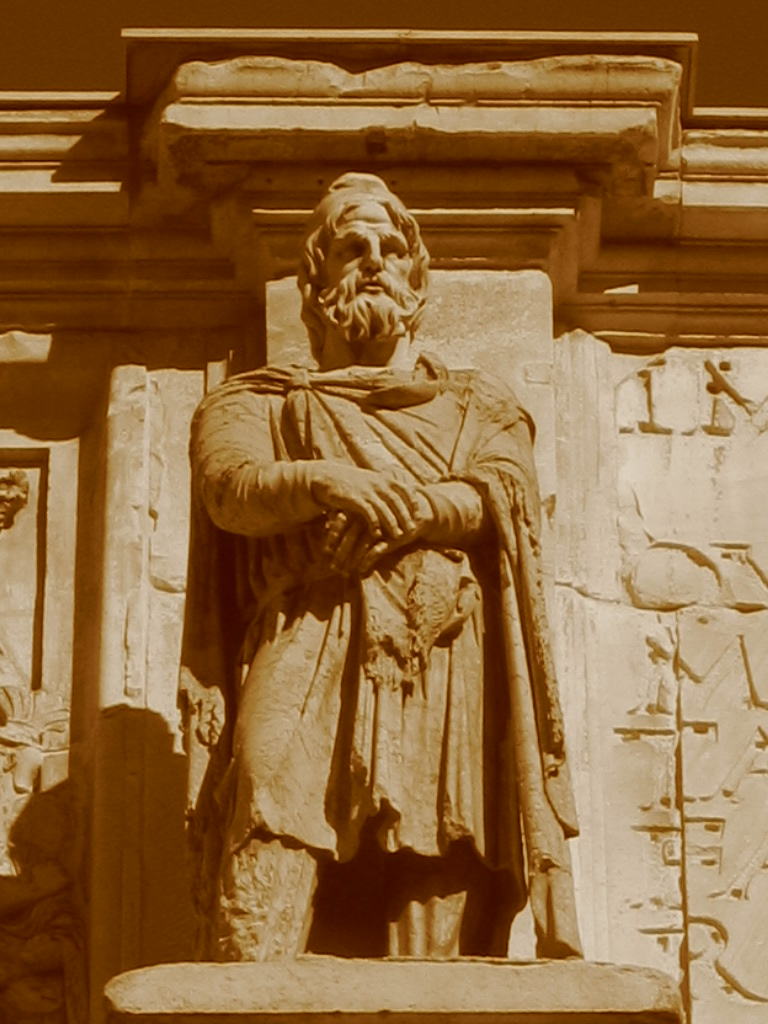
Tarabostes on the Arch of Constantine

Although the Romans conquered and destroyed the ancient Kingdom of Dacia, a large remainder of the land remained outside of Roman Imperial authority. Additionally, the conquest changed the balance of power in the region and was the catalyst for a renewed alliance of Germanic and Celtic tribes and kingdoms against the Roman Empire. However, the material advantages of the Roman Imperial system was attractive to the surviving aristocracy. Afterwards, many of the Dacians became Romanised (see also Origin of Romanians). In AD 183, war broke out in Dacia: few details are available, but it appears two future contenders for the throne of emperor Commodus, Clodius Albinus and Pescennius Niger, both distinguished themselves in the campaign.

According to Lactantius, the Roman emperor Decius (AD 249–251) had to restore Roman Dacia from the Carpo-Dacians of Zosimus "having undertaken an expedition against the Carpi, who had then possessed themselves of Dacia and Moesia".

Even so, the Germanic and Celtic kingdoms, particularly the Gothic tribes, slowly moved toward the Dacian borders, and within a generation were making assaults on the province. Ultimately, the Goths succeeded in dislodging the Romans and restoring the "independence" of Dacia following Emperor Aurelian's withdrawal, in 275.

In AD 268–269, at Naissus, Claudius II (Gothicus Maximus) obtained a decisive victory over the Goths. Since at that time Romans were still occupying Roman Dacia it is assumed that the Goths didn't cross the Danube from the Roman province. The Goths who survived their defeat didn't even attempt to escape through Dacia, but through Thrace. At the boundaries of Roman Dacia, Carpi (Free Dacians) were still strong enough to sustain five battles in eight years against the Romans from AD 301–308. Roman Dacia was left in AD 275 by the Romans, to the Carpi again, and not to the Goths. There were still Dacians in AD 336, against whom Constantine the Great fought.

The province was abandoned by Roman troops, and, according to the Breviarium historiae Romanae by Eutropius, Roman citizens "from the towns and lands of Dacia" were resettled to the interior of Moesia. Under Diocletian, c. AD 296, in order to defend the Roman border, fortifications were erected by the Romans on both banks of the Danube.

=== Late Roman Age (c. 270 – c. 700) ===
==== Constantinian reconquest ====
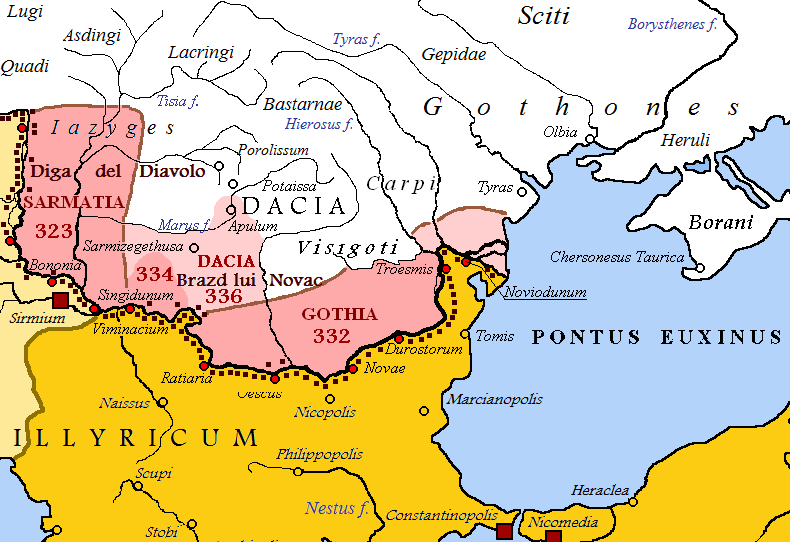
Gothic, Sarmatian and Dacian conquests of Constantine the Great

In 328 the emperor Constantine the Great inaugurated the Constantine's Bridge (Danube) at Sucidava, (today Corabia in Romania) in hopes of reconquering Dacia, a province that had been abandoned under Aurelian. In the late winter of 332, Constantine campaigned with the Sarmatians against the Goths. The weather and lack of food cost the Goths dearly: reportedly, nearly one hundred thousand died before they submitted to Rome. In celebration of this victory Constantine took the title Gothicus Maximus and claimed the subjugated territory as the new province of Gothia. In 334, after Sarmatian commoners had overthrown their leaders, Constantine led a campaign against the tribe. He won a victory in the war and extended his control over the region, as remains of camps and fortifications in the region indicate. Constantine resettled some Sarmatian exiles as farmers in Illyrian and Roman districts, and conscripted the rest into the army. The new frontier in Dacia was along of a huge earthen wall, almost 700 km long, named today the Brazda lui Novac line, supported by Castra of Hinova, Rusidava and Castra of Pietroasele. The limes passed to the north of Castra of Tirighina-Bărboși and ended at Sasyk Lagoon near the Dniester River. Constantine took the title Dacicus maximus in 336.

Before 300, the Romans erected small forts at Dierna and in other places on the northern bank of the Danube in modern-day Banat. In their wider region, Roman coins from the period—mostly of bronze—have been found. The Huns destroyed Drobeta and Sucidava in the 440s, but the forts were restored under Emperor Justinian I (527–565). Eastern Roman coins from the first half of the 6th century suggest a significant military presence in Oltenia—a region also characterized by the predominance of pottery with shapes of Roman tradition.

==== Scythia Minor ====
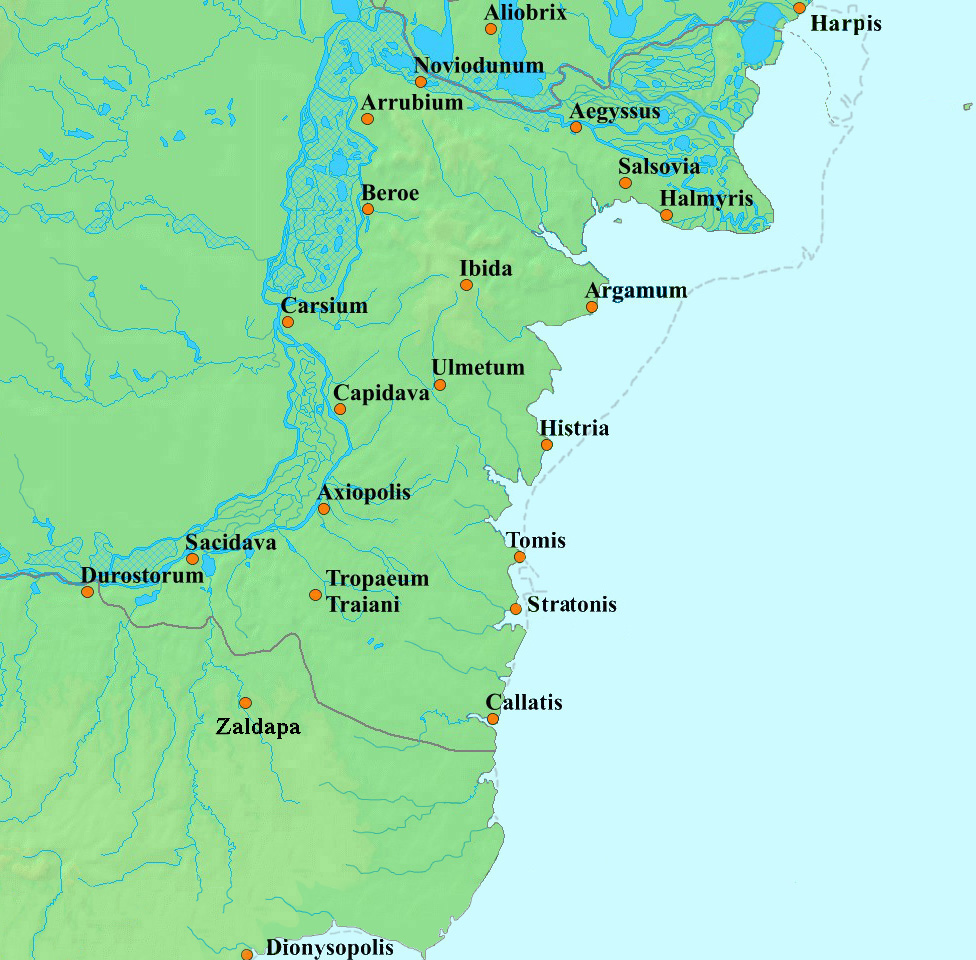
Scythia Minor: a Late Roman province formed through the division of the former province of Lower Moesia around 293

The territory between the Lower Danube and the Black Sea (today Dobrogea in Romania) remained a fully integrated part of the Roman Empire, even after the abandonment of Trajan's Dacia. It was transformed into a separate province under the name of Scythia Minor around 293.

The existence of Christian communities in Scythia Minor became evident under Emperor Diocletian (284–305). He and his co-emperors ordered the persecution of Christians throughout the empire, causing the death of many between 303 and 313. Under Emperor Constantine the Great (306–337), a bridge across the Danube was constructed at Sucidava, a new fort (Constantiana Daphne) was built, and ancient roads were repaired in Oltenia. The Lower Danube again became the empire's northern boundary in 369 at the latest, when Emperor Valens met Athanaric—the head of the Goths—in a boat in the middle of the river because the latter had taken an oath "never to set foot on Roman soil".

Although Eastern Roman emperors made annual payments to the neighboring peoples in an attempt to keep the peace in the Balkans, the Avars regularly invaded Scythia Minor from the 580s. The Romans abandoned Sucidava in 596 or 597, but Tomis, which was the last town in Scythia Minor to resist the invaders, only fell in 704.

==== North of the limes (c. 270 – c. 330) ====
Transylvania and northern Banat, which belonged to Dacia before Trajan's conquest, had no direct contact with the Roman Empire from the 270s. There is no evidence that they were invaded in the following decades. Towns, including Apulum and Ulpia Traiana Sarmizegetusa, and the surrounding areas continued to be inhabited but the urban areas diminished. The existence of local Christian communities can be assumed in Porolissum, Potaissa and other settlements. On the other hand, evidence – mainly pottery with "Chi-rho" (Χ-Ρ) signs and other Christian symbols – is "shadowy and poorly understood", according to archaeologists Haynes and Hanson.

Urns found in late 3rd-century cemeteries at Bezid, Mediaş, and in other Transylvanian settlements had clear analogies in sites east of the Carpathians, suggesting that the Carpians were the first new arrivals in the former province from the neighboring regions. Other Carpian groups, pressured by the Goths, also departed from their homeland and sought refuge in the Roman Empire around 300. Nevertheless, "Carpo-Dacians" were listed among the peoples "mixed with the Huns" as late as 379. The Sarmatians of the Banat were allies of the empire, demonstrated by a Roman invasion in 332 against the Goths, their enemies. Sarmatians were admitted into the empire in 379, but other Sarmatian groups remained in the Tisa plains up until the 460s.

== Dacia after the Romans ==
The Victohali, Taifals, and Thervingians are tribes mentioned for inhabiting Dacia in 350, after the Romans left. Archeological evidence suggests that Gepids were disputing Transylvania with Taifals and Tervingians. Taifals, once independent from Gothia, became federati of the Romans, from whom they obtained the right to settle in Oltenia.

In 376, the region was conquered by Huns, who kept it until the death of Attila in 453. The Gepid tribe, ruled by Ardaric, used it as their base, until in 566, when it was destroyed by the Lombards. Lombards abandoned the country and the Avars (second half of the 6th century) dominated the region for 230 years, until their kingdom was destroyed by Charlemagne in 791. At the same time, Slavic people arrived.

== Usage in modern culture ==
S.C. Automobile Dacia S.A., also known as Dacia, is a Romanian car manufacturer that takes its name from the historical kingdom. It is Romania's largest company by revenue, and sells its products mainly in Europe and North Africa.

== See also ==
- Dacians
  - Dacian warfare
    - Falx (weapon)
  - List of Dacian kings
  - List of Dacian cities
  - List of Dacian tribes
    - Getae
    - Carpians
    - Costoboci
  - Dacian bracelets
  - Dacian draco
  - Dacian language
    - List of Dacian names
    - List of Dacian plant names
- History of Dacia
- Trajan's Column
- Trajan's Bridge

== Notes ==
Preceded by Prehistory of the Balkans	History of Romania	Succeeded by Roman Dacia
