= Rholes =

Ancient Getae chieftain

Rholes or Roles (Ancient Greek Ῥώλης) was a Getae chieftain in Scythia Minor (modern Dobruja) mentioned by Cassius Dio in his Roman History. According to Dio, he helped Roman general Marcus Licinius Crassus defeat the Bastarnae, and when he visited Octavian, he was treated as "a friend and ally" for his support for the Romans. Later he sent for Crassus to help in his conflict with Getae chieftain Dapyx. These events have been dated to 31-27 BC.

== See also ==
- List of rulers in Thrace and Dacia
- List of ancient cities in Thrace and Dacia
- Capidava
