= Dapyx =

Ancient tribal chieftain

Dapyx was a 1st-century BC chieftain of a Getae tribe or a tribe union in Scythia Minor (nowadays in Dobruja).

The Roman historian Cassius Dio talks about him in his report on the campaigns of Marcus Licinius Crassus on the Lower Danube region. Dapyx is said to be a king on the region of central Scythia Minor who went to war with Rholes, a Roman ally. Crassus came to Roles' assistance and comprehensively defeated Dapyx's army, with their leader taking refuge in a fort, being betrayed and killed. (Note: While he was thus engaged, Roles, who had become embroiled with Dapyx, himself also king of a tribe of the Getae, sent for him. Crassus went to his aid, and by hurling the horse of his opponents back upon their infantry he so thoroughly terrified the latter also that what followed was no longer a battle but a great slaughter of fleeing men of both arms. Next he cut off Dapyx, who had taken refuge in a fort, and besieged him. In the course of the siege someone hailed him from the walls in Greek, obtained a conference with him, and arranged to betray the place. The barbarians, thus captured, turned upon one another, and Dapyx was killed along with many others. His brother, however, Crassus took alive, and not only did him no harm but actually released him.)

== Bibliography ==
- Brodersen, Kai (2020). Dacia felix: Das antike Rumänien im Brennpunkt der Kulturen. Darmstadt: wbg. ISBN 978-3-8053-5059-4.
- Cassius Dio (1927). Earnest Cary (ed.). Historia Romana [Roman History].
