= Thyssagetae =

Ancient tribe described by Herodotus

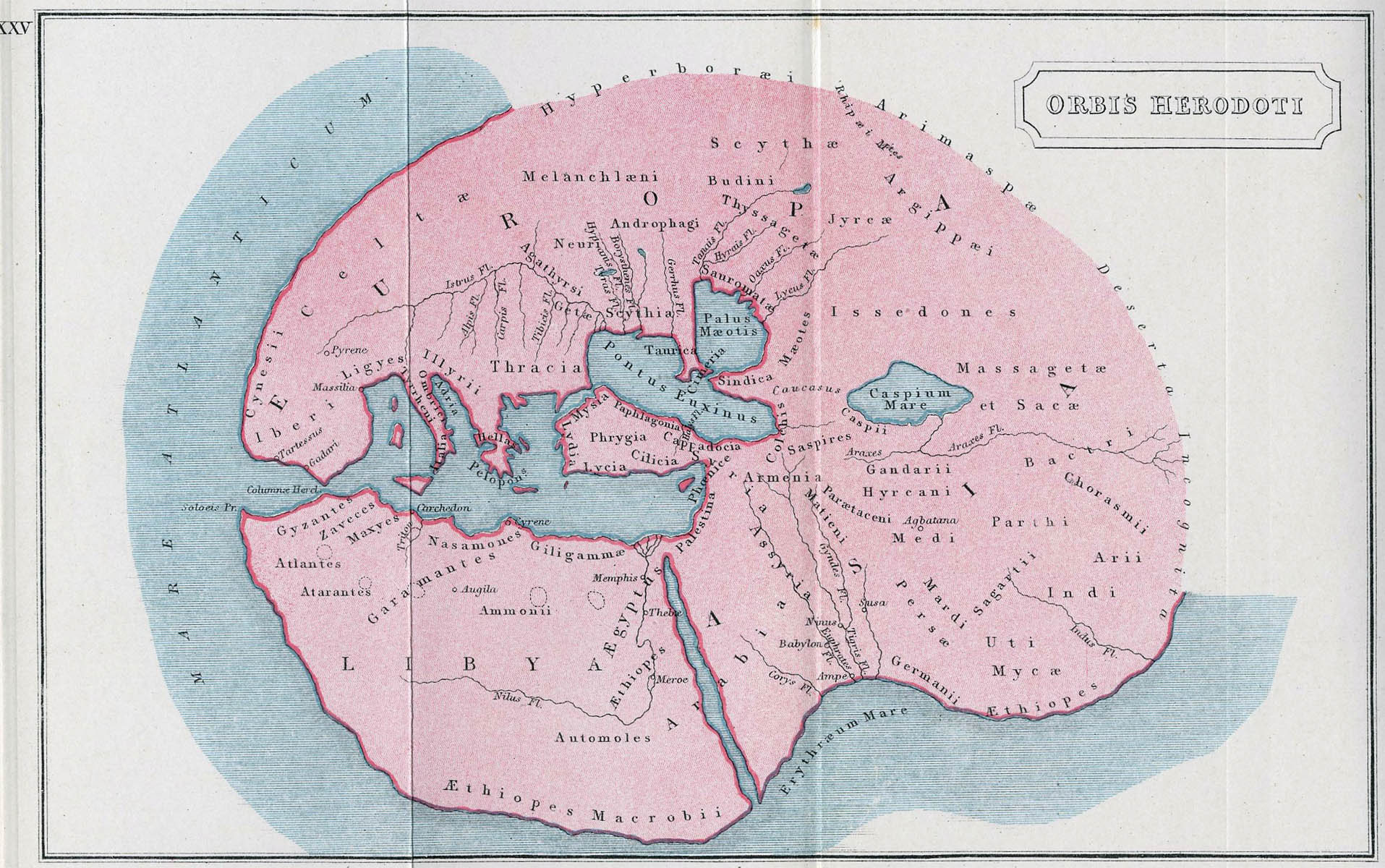
Map depicting the world as described by Herodotus, with the Thyssagetae on the northern banks of the 'Palus Maeotis'

The Thyssagetae (Ancient Greek: Θυσσαγέται) were an ancient tribe described by Herodotus as occupying a district to the north-east of Scythia, separated from the Budini by a "desert" that took seven days to cross. The Thyssagetae therefore seem to have occupied the southern end of the Ural Mountains, north of the Caspian Sea.

According to the 19th Century archaeologist Sir Ellis Minns, the form of their name suggests that the Thyssagetae spoke an Iranian language, such as Scythian or Sarmatian, like the neighbouring Massagetae (on the north-east shores of the Caspian).

The 15th Century chronicler Giacomo Filippo Foresti (a.k.a. Jacobus Philippus Foresti da Bergamo) mentioned a river in the area named the Thisageta, and Minns suggested that the name of the Chusovaya (or Chussovaja) River in the Urals may be linked to the Thyssagetae.

According to Ellis Minns, while Herodotus claimed that four rivers from the land of the Thyssagetae flowed into the Maeotis (Sea of Azov), he appears to have been mistaken. He may have confused the Caspian Sea with the Maeotis, as one of the rivers, named the "Oarus", was almost certainly the Volga.

== See also ==
- Getae
- Massagetae
- Tyragetae
- Geats
- Gutes
