= Deceneus =

1st century BC Dacian high priest

Deceneus or Decaeneus (Greek: Δεκαίνεος, Dekaineos) was a priest of Dacia during the reign of Burebista (82/61–45/44 BC). He is mentioned in the near-contemporary Greek Geographica of Strabo and in the 6th-century Latin Getica of Jordanes, where he is called Dicineus.

In Strabo's account, Decaeneus is the second most powerful man among the Dacian and Getic tribes and their high priest. His support for Burebista is key to the latter's attaining and holding power over all the tribes. He succeeded to political power in a reduced area after Burebista's death, but he does not appear to have taken the royal title. Jordanes' account is derivative of Strabo's. He credits Dicineus with bringing civilization to the Goths (whom he equates with the Getae). He places him between Zeuta and Zalmoxis as second in a succession of Dacian wise men.
