= Setidava =

Dacian fortified settlement

Setidava, mentioned by Ptolemy in his Geography, was a Dacian outpost in north central Europe. This town, with the typical Dacian location name ending of -dava, was mentioned in Ptolemy's Germania, who placed it north of Calisia (Kalisia), which is probably located at the present-day town of Kalisz, in Poland. Setidava was not far from the Warta River; most likely it was located in present-day Żnin.

Ptolemy's manuscript also included the variant spelling Getidava.

Setidava is believed to be the place of origin of the tribe Costoboci (also known as the Koistobokoi transmontanoi) who were in possession of areas in what is now Poland, as late as c. 170 AD.

== See also ==
- Dacian davae
- Dacia
- List of ancient cities in Thrace and Dacia
