= Zalmodegikos =

Getan king who ruled around 200 BC

Zalmodegikos was a Getan king who ruled around 200 BC.
