= Zalmoxis =

Thracian god

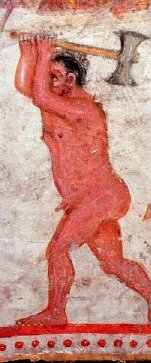
A Thracian tomb painting at the Aleksandrovska Grobnitsa (Bulgaria), which possibly depicts Zalmoxis, or a servant assisting him on a hunt.

Zalmoxis (Note: Ancient Greek: Ζάλμοξις; also known as Salmoxis (Σάλμοξις), Zalmoxes (Ζάλμοξες), Zamolxis (Ζάμολξις), Samolxis (Σάμολξις), Zamolxes (Ζάμολξες), or Zamolxe (Ζάμολξε)) is a divinity of the Getae and Dacians (a people of the lower Danube), mentioned by Herodotus in his Histories Book IV, 93–96, written before 425 BC.

He is said to have been so called from the bear's skin (ζάλμος, zalmos) in which he was clothed as soon as he was born.

According to Jordanes' Getica, he was a learned philosopher, before whom two other learned men existed, by the names of Zeuta and Deceneus.

== Herodotus ==
Herodotus writes about Zalmoxis in book 4 of his Histories:

93. ... the Getae are the bravest of the Thracians and the most just. 94. They believe they are immortal forever living in the following sense: they think they do not die and that the one who dies joins Zalmoxis, a divine being; some call this same divine being Gebeleizis. Every four years, they send a messenger to Zalmoxis, who is chosen by chance. They ask him to tell Zalmoxis what they want on that occasion. The mission is performed in the following way: men standing there for that purpose hold three spears; other people take the one who is sent to Zalmoxis by his hands and feet and fling him in the air on the spears. If he dies pierced, they think that the divinity is going to help them; if he does not die, it is he who is accused and they declare that he is a bad person. And, after he has been charged, they send another one. The messenger is told the requests while he is still alive. The same Thracians, on other occasions, when he thunders and lightens, shoot with arrows up in the air against the sky and menace the divinity because they think there is no god other than their own.

Herodotus asserts that Zalmoxis was originally a human being, a slave who converted the Thracians to his beliefs. The Greeks of the Hellespont and the Black Sea tell that Zalmoxis was a slave of Pythagoras, son of Mnesarchos, on the island of Samos. After being liberated, he gathered huge wealth and, once rich, went back to his homeland. Thracians lived simple hard lives. Zalmoxis had lived among the wisest of Greeks, such as Pythagoras, and had been initiated into Ionian life and the Eleusinian Mysteries. He built a banquet hall, and received the chiefs and his fellow countrymen at a banquet. He taught that neither his guests nor their descendants would ever die, but instead would go to a place where they would live forever in complete happiness. He then dug an underground residence. When it was finished, he disappeared from Thrace, living for three years in his underground residence. The Thracians missed him and wept fearing him dead. The fourth year, he came back among them and thus they believed what Zalmoxis had told them.

Zalmoxis may have lived much earlier than Pythagoras and was rumored either to be a divine being or from the country of the Getae.

"Now I neither disbelieve nor entirely believe the tale about Salmoxis and his underground chamber; but I think that he lived many years before Pythagoras; [2] and as to whether there was a man called Salmoxis or this is some deity native to the Getae, let the question be dismissed." — Herodotus

Scholars have several different theories about this account by Herodotus the disappearance and return of Zalmoxis:

- Herodotus is mocking the barbarian beliefs of the Getae.
- Zalmoxis created a ritual of passage. This theory is mainly supported by Mircea Eliade, who wrote the first coherent interpretation of the myth about Zalmoxis.
- Zalmoxis is related to Pythagoras, stating that he founded a mystical cult. This theory may be found in Eliade's work.

This last theory precisely parallels the legend of the universal king Frode, given in both Ynglingsaga and Gesta Danorum of Saxo Grammaticus, particularly Ynglingsaga 12 and Gesta Danorum, in which Frode disappears into the earth for three years after his death.

It is difficult to define the time when a cult to Zalmoxis may have existed. It is only certain that it predates Herodotus, who lived in the 5th century BC. Some scholars have suggested that the archaic doctrine of Zalmoxis points to a heritage from before the times of Indo-Europeans, but this is difficult, if not impossible, to demonstrate.

Plato claims that Zalmoxis was also a great physician who took a holistic approach to healing body and soul (psyche), being thus used by Plato for his own philosophical conceptions.

According to Dan Dana, Herodotus "constitutes the singular pertinent ancient source regarding Zalmoxis." Zoe Petre stated that all theories about Zamolxianism are mere speculations, with Herdotodus being the only author who knew one of its moments. Ion Pogorilovschi wrote that the cosmogonic worldview of the Geto-Dacians remains unknown in ancient sources.

== Religion of the Getae ==
Strabo in his Geography mentions a certain Deceneus (Dékainéos) whom he calls a γόητα "magician". According to Strabo, king Burebista (82–44 BC) hired Deceneus, who had been in Egypt, to "tame" his people. As a sign of the people's obedience, they consented to destroy all their wines as ordered by Deceneus. The "reform of Deceneus" is the interpretation by the 6th-century bishop and historian Jordanes, who includes the Getae in his history of the Goths (as assumed ancestors of the Goths). Jordanes describes how Deceneus taught the Getae philosophy and physics. Even if it is more probable that Jordanes interjected his own philosophical knowledge into the text, many modern Romanian authors consider that Deceneus was a priest who reformed the religion of the Getae, changing the worship of Zalmoxis into a popular religion and imposing strict religious rules, such as the restriction of wine consumption.

According to Iamblichus (280–333 AD), "for instructing the Getae in these things, and for having written laws for them, Zalmoxis was by them considered as the greatest of the gods."

Aristotle is said, in the brief epitome of his Magicus given by Diogenes Laertes, to have compared Zalmoxis with the Phoenician Okhon and Libyan Atlas. Some authors assume Zalmoxis was another name of Sabazius, the Thracian Dionysus, or Zeus. Sabazius appears in Jordanes as Gebelezis. Leaving aside the suffixes -zius/-zis, the root Saba- = Gebele-, suggesting a relationship of the name of the goddess Cybele, as "Cybele's Zeus". Mnaseas of Patrae identified Zalmoxis with Cronos, as does Hesychius, who has "Σάλμοξις ὁ Κρόνος".

In Plato's writings, Zalmoxis is mentioned as skilled in the arts of incantation. Zalmoxis gave his name to a particular type of singing and dancing (Hesych). His realm as a god is not very clear, as some considered him to be a sky-god, a god of the dead, or a god of the Mysteries.

Celsus, in the fragments of his work against Christianity preserved by Origen, denounces the followers of Zalmoxis as amongst those who "practise such juggling tricks, in order to deceive their simple hearers, and who make gain by their deception".

== Zalmoxian religion ==
The "Zalmoxian religion" is the subject of a scholarly debate that has continued since the beginning of the 20th century. According to some scholars, such as Vasile Pârvan, R. Pettazzon, E. Rohde and Sorin Paliga, since ancient sources do not mention any god of the Getae other than Zalmoxis, the Getae were monotheistic. However, Herodotus is the only ancient author who explicitly states that the Getae had only one divinity. The sending of a messenger to Zalmoxis and the fact that Getae shot arrows towards the sky have prompted some authors to believe Zalmoxis was a sky god, but his journey into a cavern has led others to suggest that he was a chthonic divinity.

A third group of scholars believe that the Getae, like other Indo-European peoples, were polytheistic. They draw on ancient authors such as Diodorus Siculus, who states that the Getae worshipped Hestia as well as Zalmoxis.

== Etymology ==
A number of etymologies have been given for the name. In his Vita Pythagorae, Porphyrius (3rd century) says that he was so named because he had been wrapped in a bearskin at birth, and zalmon is the Thracian word for "hide" (τὴν γὰρ δορὰν οἱ Θρᾷκες ζαλμὸν καλοῦσιν). Hesychius (c. 5th century) has zemelen (ζέμελεν) as a Phrygian word for "foreign slave".

The correct spelling of the name is also uncertain. Manuscripts of Herodotus' Historiae have all four spellings, viz. Zalmoxis, Salmoxis, Zamolxis, Samolxis, with a majority of manuscripts favouring Salmoxis. Later authors show a preference for Zamolxis. Hesychius quotes Herodotus, using Zalmoxis.

The -m-l- variant (Zamolxis) is favoured by those wishing to derive the name from a conjectured Thracian word for "earth", *zamol. Comparisons have also been made with the name of Zemelo and Žemelė, the Phrygian and Lithuanian goddess of the earth, and with the Lithuanian chthonic god Žemeliūkštis. The Lithuanian word Žalmuo means "corn shoot" or "fresh grass". Žalmokšnis is another possible form of it.

The -l-m- variant is admitted to be the older form and the correct form by the majority of Thracologists, as this is the form found in the older Herodotus manuscripts and other ancient sources. The -l-m- form is further attested in Daco-Thracian in Zalmodegikos, the name of a Getic King; and in Thracian zalmon, 'hide', and zelmis, 'hide' (PIE *kel-, 'to cover'; cf. English helm).

The other name for Zalmoxis, Gebeleizis, is also spelled Belaizis and Belaixis in Herodotus manuscripts.

According to Mircea Eliade:

The fact that Romanian folk mythology around their prophet Elijah contains many elements of a god of the storm proves at least that Gebeleizis was still active in the moment when Dacia was christianised, whatever his name was in this era. It can also be admitted that subsequently a religious syncretism, encouraged by the high priest and the priestly class, ended up on confusing Gebeleizis with Zalmoxis.

== See also ==
- Orpheus
- Zāl
- Zalmoxianism
