= Scythia Minor (Dobruja) =

Scythian kingdom on the lower Danube

Scythia Minor Μικρά Σκυθία
- c. 2nd century BCE–c. 109 BCE
- Common languages: Ancient Greek; Scythian
- Religion: Scythian religion Ancient Greek religion
- Government: Monarchy
- King
  - c. 2nd century BCE: Kanitos
  - c. 2nd century BCE: Tanusakos
  - c. 2nd century BCE: Kharaspos
  - c. 2nd century BCE: Ailios
  - c. 2nd century BCE: Sariakos
  - c. 2nd century BCE: Akrosakos
- Historical era: Hellenistic period
  - Established: c. 2nd century BCE
  - Disestablished: c. 109 BCE
Preceded by	Succeeded by
Scythian kingdom in the Pontic steppe	Kingdom of Pontus; Roman Empire
- Today part of: Bulgaria, Romania

The Scythian kingdom on the lower Danube (Ancient Greek: Μικρά Σκυθία, romanized: Mikra Skuthia; Latin: Scythia Minor) was a kingdom created by the Scythians during the 3rd century BCE in the western Eurasian Steppe.

== Geography ==
The territory of the Scythian kingdom on the lower Danube stretched from Tyras or even Pontic Olbia in the north to Odessus in the south.

== History ==
=== Background ===
The Scythians were an ancient Iranian nomadic people who originated in Central Asia in the 9th century BCE, from where they migrated into Western Asia in the 7th century BCE before settling in the Pontic steppe in the 6th century BCE. During the height of this Pontic Scythian kingdom, in the 4th century BCE, Crimea and the Dobruja region started being called "Little Scythia" (Ancient Greek: Μικρά Σκυθία, romanized: Mikra Skuthia; Latin: Scythia Minor).

In the 3rd century BCE, the expansion in the northern Pontic region of the Sarmatians, who were another nomadic Iranian people related to the Scythians, as well as of the Thracian Getai, the Germanic Bastarnai and Skiroi, and of the Celts, the Scythian kingdom disappeared from the Pontic Steppe and the Sarmatians replaced the Scythians as the dominant power of the Pontic steppe, due to which the appelation of "Scythia" for the region became replaced by that of "Sarmatia Europea" (European Sarmatia).

The Scythians fled to the Scythia Minor in Crimea, where they were able to securely establish themselves against the Sarmatian invasion despite tensions with the Greeks, and to the Scythia Minor in Dobrugea, as well as to nearby regions, where they became limited in enclaves. By then, these Scythians were no longer nomadic: they had become sedentary farmers and were Hellenised, and the only places where the Scythians could still be found by the 2nd century BCE were in the Scythiae Minorae of Crimea and Dobrugea, as well as in the lower reaches of the Dnipro river.

=== Kingdom ===
The Scythia Minor of the lower Danube existed until the 1st century BCE, and its territory stretched from Turas or even Olbia Pontikē in the north to Odēssos in the south, and coins are known of several of their kings, namely Kanitos, Tanusakos, Kharaspos, Ailios, Sariakos, and Akrosakos. The relative chronology of these rulers has been debated for the better part of two centuries, but has recently (as of 2023) been established through close attention to all the available evidence and scholarship by numismatists Stolyarik and Kleeberg. Like the Crimean Scythia Minor, the Scythian kingdom in the lower Danube region was destroyed by the Pontic king Mithradatēs VI Eupatōr, although its population continued to exist.

In 62 BCE the lower Danube Scythians fought a battle against the Roman general Gaius Antonius Hybrida at Histriē.

=== Aftermath ===
By 50 to 150 CE, most of the Scythians had been assimilated by the Sarmatians.

=== Kings of Danubian Scythians ===
- Kanitos, reigned c. 2nd century BC
- Tanusakos, reigned c. 2nd century BC
- Kharaspos, reigned c. 2nd century BC
- Ailios, reigned c. 2nd century BC
- Sariakos, reigned c. 2nd century BC
- Akrosakos, reigned c. 2nd century BC

== See also ==
- Scythian kingdom in Crimea

== Sources ==
- Batty, Roger (2007). Rome and the Nomads: The Pontic-Danubian Realm in Antiquity. Oxford: Oxford University Press. ISBN 978-0-198-14936-1.
- Ivantchik, Askold (April 25, 2018). "Scythians". Encyclopædia Iranica.
