= Charaspes =

Charaspes was a Scythian king ruling in the Black Sea region.

He was initially thought to be the King of Sophene c. 230 BC, attested only by a single coin currently kept in the Bibliothèque Nationale in Paris.

However, there is controversy whether or not this king is actually an Armenian: he is not mentioned in the inscriptions on Mount Nemrut which list the ancestors of Antiochus I Theos, and from other coin finds it appears that Charaspes was the name of a Scythian king in the western Black Sea region. It is quite possible that he is not an Armenian king, but rather a numismatical error.
