= Rubobostes =

Dacian king in Transylvania

Rubobostes was a Dacian king in Transylvania, during the 2nd century BC.

He was mentioned in Gnaeus Pompeius Trogus's Prolegomena. Trogus wrote that during his rule, the Dacians' power increased, as they defeated the Celts who previously held the power in the region.

Trogus Pompeius and Justin mention a rise in Dacian authority under the leadership of King Rubobostes (before 168 BC) which probably suggests the end of Celtic dominance in Transylvania, that is, that they were possibly thrust out of Dacia by the growing power of an indigenous dynasty. Alternatively, some scholars have proposed that the Transylvanian Celts remained but merged into the local culture context and thus ceased to be distinctive archaeologically. It is possible that both processes were partially responsible for the disappearance of La Tène material in Romania.

King Rubobostes is often considered the first king of the Dacian Kingdom (168-44 B.C), his successor to the throne being king Burebista, another successful warlord who went on to expand the borders of the Kingdom during his reign (82-44 B.C). After his death, the Dacian Kingdom collapsed and split into several different tribal Dacian states, reunited only in 87 A.D by King Decebalus, a war lord who managed to unite the Dacians for a short time up until the Roman-Dacian wars (101-102 A.D) (104-105 A.D). The Dacian people would never be reunited again.
