= Getae =

Thracian tribe of modern northern Bulgaria and southern Romania

The area of land most often historically associated with the Getae people, shown in red dots at the mouth of the Danube River

The Getae or Getai (/ˈɡɛ.tiː/ or /ˈdʒiː.tiː/, GHEH-tee or JEE-tee; Ancient Greek: Γέται; also Getans) were a large nation who inhabited the regions to either side of the Lower Danube in what is today northern Bulgaria and southern Romania, throughout much of Classical Antiquity. The main source of information about the Getae are Greek and Roman chroniclers, who write that the Getae were closely related to the neighbouring Thracians to the south and Dacians to the north. Cassius Dio writes that the Getae are the same people as the Dacians, Getae being the Greek name for the Dacians. Modern scholars continue to debate the details of these relationships.

The Getae first appear in historical records as fierce opponents of the Persian invasion in 513 BC, as described by the early Greek historian Herodotus. They faded out of historical records during the Roman Empire, when many appear to have become Romans, and others north of the Danube were gradually overwhelmed by other peoples moving from the north and east towards the Roman frontier.

== Ethnonym ==
The ethnonym Getae (Ancient Greek: Γέται) was first used by Herodotus. The root was also used for the Tyragetae, Thyssagetae, Massagetae and others.

== Getae and Dacians ==
=== Ancient sources ===
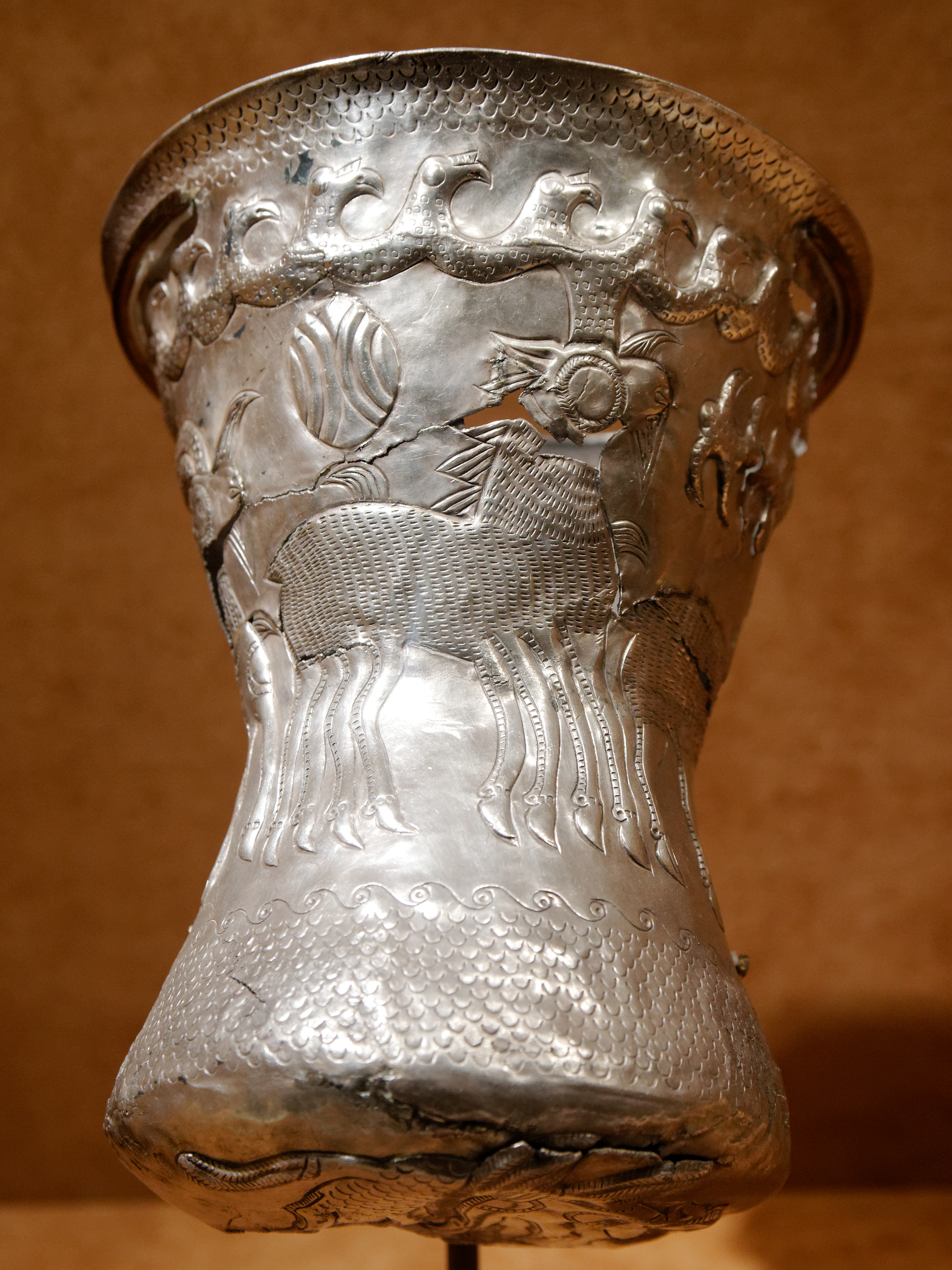
Beaker with birds and animals, Thraco-Getic, 4th century BC, silver, height: 18.7 cm (7.4 in), Metropolitan Museum of Art

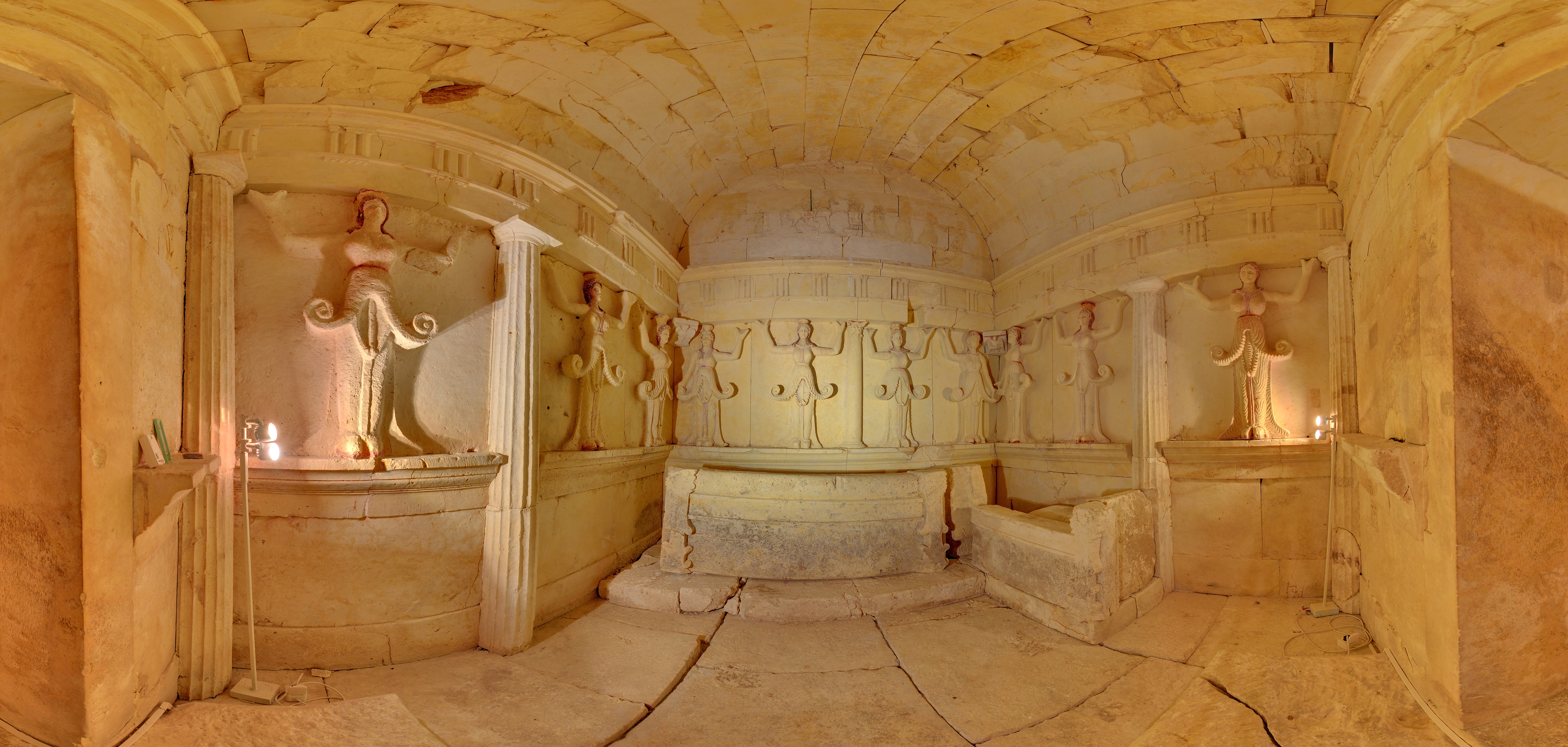
The Thracian Tomb of Sveshtari, 3rd century BC

Strabo stated in his Geographica (c. 7 BC – 20 AD) wrote that the term "Dacian" was used by some people to refer to the western part of the Getae who lived north of the Danube "towards Germania and the sources of the Danube", and the other Getae lived in the eastern parts, towards the Black Sea, both south and north of the Danube. According to him, the Dacians and Getae spoke the same language, after stating the same about Getae and Thracians.

In his time, Strabo believed that the lands of these western Getae stretched north of the Danube to the boundary of Germania, embracing a part of the mountains of the Hercynian Forest where the Suevi lived. From here their lands stretched very far to east of the Carpathians, to the lands of the Tyragetae, who lived near the Dniester, although he cautioned that the precise boundaries were not known to him.

Pliny the Elder, in his Naturalis Historia (Natural History), c. 77–79 AD, refers to "the Getae, by the Romans called Daci".

Appian, who began writing his Roman History under Antoninus Pius, Roman Emperor from 138 to 161, noted: "[B]ut going beyond these rivers in places they rule some of the Celts over the Rhine and the Getae over the Danube, whom they call Dacians".

Justin, the 3rd century AD Latin historian, wrote in his Epitome of Pompeius Trogus that Dacians are spoken of as descendants of the Getae: "Daci quoque suboles Getarum sunt" (The Dacians as well are a scion of the Getae).

In his Roman History (c. 200 AD), Cassius Dio added: "I call the people Dacians, the name used by the natives themselves as well as by the Romans, though I am not ignorant that some Greek writers refer to them as Getae, whether that is the right term or not...".

=== Modern interpretations ===
There is a dispute among scholars about the relations between the Getae and Dacians, and this dispute also covers the interpretation of ancient sources. Some historians such as Ronald Arthur Crossland state that even Ancient Greeks used the two designations "interchangeable or with some confusion". Thus, it is generally considered that the two groups were related to a certain degree; the exact relation is a matter of controversy.

==== Same people ====
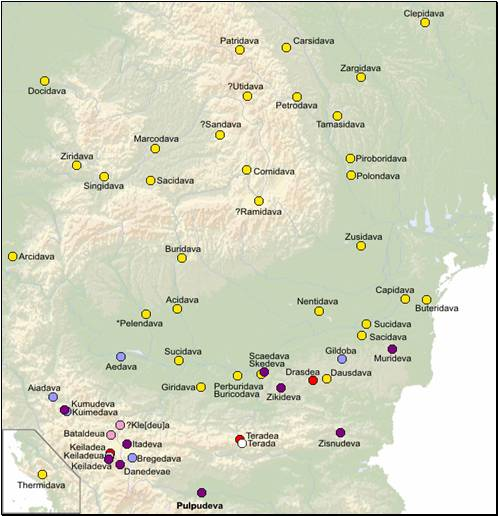
Onomastic range of towns with the dava or deva ending considered to be characteristic of the Dacian language. They are mostly found throughout Dacia and northern Thrace, some also in eastern Illyria.

Strabo, as well as other ancient sources, led some modern historians to consider that, if the Thracian ethnic group should be divided, one of this divisions should be the "Daco-Getae". The linguist Ivan Duridanov also identified a "Dacian linguistic area" in Dacia, Scythia Minor, Lower Moesia, and Upper Moesia.

Romanian scholars generally went further with the identification, historian Constantin C. Giurescu claiming the two were identical. The archaeologist Mircea Babeș spoke of a "veritable ethno-cultural unity" between the Getae and the Dacians. According to Glanville Price, the account of the Greek geographer Strabo shows that the Getae and the Dacians were one and the same people. Others who support the identity between Getae and Dacians with ancient sources include freelance writer James Minahan and Catherine B. Avery, who claim the people whom the Greek called Getae were called Daci by the Romans. This same belief is stated by some British historians such as David Sandler Berkowitz and Philip Matyszak. The Bulgarian historian and thracologist Alexander Fol considers that the Getae became known as "Dacians" in Greek and Latin in the writings of Caesar, Strabo and Pliny the Elder, as Roman observers adopted the name of the Dacian tribe to refer to all the unconquered inhabitants north of the Danube. Also, Edward Bunbury believed the name of Getae, by which they were originally known to the Greeks on the Euxine, was always retained by the latter in common usage: while that of Dacians, whatever be its origin, was that by which the more western tribes, adjoining the Pannonians, first became known to the Romans. Some scholars consider the Getae and Dacians to be the same people at different stages of their history and discuss their culture as Geto-Dacian.

==== Same language, distinct people ====
Historian and archaeologist Alexandru Vulpe found a remarkable uniformity of the Geto-Dacian culture; however, he is one of the few Romanian archaeologists to make a clear distinction between the Getae and Dacians, arguing against the traditional position of the Romanian historiography that considered the two people the same. Nevertheless, he chose to use the term "Geto-Dacians" as a conventional concept for the Thracian tribes inhabiting the future territory of Romania, not necessarily meaning an "absolute ethnic, linguistic or historical unity".

Crossland suggested the two designations may refer to two groups of a "linguistically homogeneous people" that had come to historical prominence at two distinct periods of time. He also compared the probable linguistic situation with the relation between modern Norwegian and Danish languages. Paul Lachlan MacKendrick considered the two as "branches" of the same tribe, speaking two dialects of a common language.

The Romanian historian of ideas and historiographer Lucian Boia stated: "At a certain point, the phrase Geto-Dacian was coined in the Romanian historiography to suggest a unity of Getae and Dacians". Lucian Boia took a sceptical position, arguing the ancient writers distinguished among the two people, treating them as two distinct groups of the Thracian ethnos. Boia contended that it would be naive to assume Strabo knew the Thracian dialects so well, alleging that Strabo had "no competence in the field of Thracian dialects". The latter claim is contested, some studies attesting Strabo's reliability and sources. There is no reason to disregard Strabo's belief that the Daci and the Getae spoke the same language. Boia also stressed that some Romanian authors cited Strabo indiscriminately.

A similar position was adopted by Romanian historian and archaeologist G. A. Niculescu, who also criticized the Romanian historiography and the archaeological interpretation, particularly on the "Geto-Dacian" culture. In his opinion, Alexandru Vulpe saw ancient people as modern nations, leading the latter to interpret the common language as a sign of a common people, despite Strabo making a distinction between the two.

== History ==
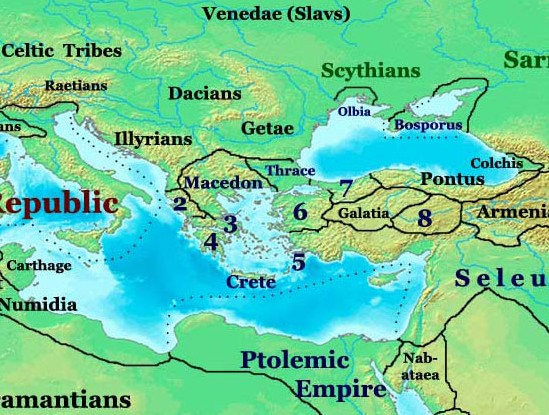
Eastern Europe in 200 BC showing the Getae north of the Danube river

=== 7th – 4th centuries BC ===
From the 7th century BC onwards, the Getae came into economic and cultural contact with the Greeks, who were establishing colonies on the western side of Pontus Euxinus, nowadays the Black Sea. The Getae are mentioned for the first time together in Herodotus in his narrative of the Scythian campaign of Darius I in 513 BC, during which the latter conquered the Getae. According to Herodotus, the Getae differed from other Thracian tribes in their religion, centered around the god (daimon) Zalmoxis whom some of the Getae called Gebeleizis.

But the Getans, who are the bravest of the Thracians, and most sensitive to the demands of justice as well, became obstinate, and were promptly enslaved.

— Herodotus. the Histories, 4.93. trans. Tom Holland

Between the 5th and 3rd centuries BC, the Getae were mostly under the rule of the flourishing Odrysian kingdom. During this time, the Getae provided military services and became famous for their cavalry. After the disintegration of the Odrysian kingdom, smaller Getic principalities began to consolidate themselves.

=== Prosperity ===
Before setting out on his Persian expedition, Alexander the Great defeated the Getae and razed one of their settlements. In 313 BC, the Getae formed an alliance with Callatis, Odessos, and other western Pontic Greek colonies against Lysimachus, who held a fortress at Tirizis (modern Kaliakra).

The Getae flourished especially in the first half of the 3rd century BC. By about 200 BC, the authority of the Getic prince, Zalmodegicus, stretched as far as Histria, as a contemporary inscription shows. Other strong princes included Zoltes and Rhemaxos (about 180 BC). Also, several Getic rulers minted their own coins. The ancient authors Strabo and Cassius Dio say that Getae practiced ruler cult, and this is confirmed by archaeological remains.

=== Conflict with Rome ===
In 72–71 BC Marcus Terentius Varro Lucullus became the first Roman commander to march against the Getae. This was done to strike at the western Pontic allies of Mithridates VI, but he had limited success. A decade later, a coalition of Scythians, Getae, Bastarnae and Greek colonists defeated C. Antonius Hybrida at Histria. This victory over the Romans allowed Burebista, the leader of this coalition, to dominate the region for a short period (60–50 BC).

In the mid-first century BC Burebista organized a kingdom consisting of descendants of those whom the Greeks had called Getae, as well as Dacians, or Daci, the name applied to people of the region by the Romans.

Augustus aimed at subjugating the entire Balkan peninsula, and used an incursion of the Bastarnae across the Danube as a pretext to devastate the Getae and Thracians. He put Marcus Licinius Crassus in charge of the plan. In 29 BC, Crassus defeated the Bastarnae with the help of the Getic prince Rholes. Crassus promised him help for his support against the Getic ruler Dapyx. After Crassus had reached as far the Danube Delta, Rholes was appointed king and returned to Rome. In 16 BC, the Sarmatae invaded the Getic territory and were driven back by Roman troops. The Getae were placed under the control of the Roman vassal king in Thrace, Rhoemetalces I. In 6 AD, the province of Moesia was founded, incorporating the Getae south of the Danube River. The Getae north of the Danube continued tribal autonomy outside the Roman Empire.

== Culture ==
According to Herodotus, the Getae were "the noblest as well as the most just of all the Thracian tribes". When the Persians, led by Darius the Great, campaigned against the Scythians, the Thracian tribes in the Balkans surrendered to Darius on his way to Scythia, and only the Getae offered resistance.

One episode from the history of the Getae is attested by several ancient writers.

When Lysimachus tried to subdue the Getae he was defeated by them. The Getae king, Dromichaetes, took him prisoner but he treated him well and convinced Lysimachus there is more to gain as an ally than as an enemy of the Getae and released him. According to Diodorus, Dromichaetes entertained Lysimachus at his palace at Helis, where food was served on gold and silver plates. The discovery of the celebrated tomb at Sveshtari (1982) suggests that Helis was located perhaps in its vicinity, where remains of a large antique city are found along with dozens of other Thracian mound tombs.

As stated earlier, just like the Dacians, the principal god of the Getae was Zalmoxis whom they sometimes called Gebeleizis.

These same Thracians, whenever there is thunder or lightning, fire arrows up into the sky, and shake their fists at Zeus, in the belief that there is no god save their own.

— Herodotus. the Histories, 4.94. trans. Tom Holland

Pliny the Elder in his Naturalis Historia mentions a tribe called the Tyragetae, apparently a Daco-Thracian tribe who dwelt by the river Tyras (the Dniester). Their tribal name appears to be a combination of Tyras and Getae; see also the names Thyssagetae and Massagetae.

The Roman poet Ovid, during his long exile in Tomis, is asserted to have written poetry (now lost) in the Getic language. In his Epistulae ex Ponto, written from the northern coast of the Black Sea, he asserts that two major, distinct languages were spoken by the sundry tribes of Scythia, which he referred to as Getic, and Sarmatian.

== Physical appearance ==
Jerome (Letter CVII to Laeta. II) described the Getae as red and yellow-haired though he may be referring to the Goths, with whom the Getae were sometimes confused in Late Antiquity.

== Fringe views on alternative origins ==
=== Suggested link to Goths ===
The Getae are sometimes confused with the Goths in works of early medieval authors. This confusion is notably expanded on in works of Jordanes, himself of Gothic background, who transferred earlier historical narratives about the Getae to the Goths. At the close of the 4th century AD, Claudian, court poet to the emperor Honorius and the patrician Stilicho, uses the ethnonym Getae to refer to the Visigoths.

During 5th and 6th centuries, several historians and ethnographers (Marcellinus Comes, Orosius, John Lydus, Isidore of Seville, Procopius of Caesarea) used the same ethnonym Getae to name populations invading the Eastern Roman Empire (Goths, Gepids, Kutrigurs, Slavs). For instance, in the third book of the History of the Wars Procopius details: "There were many Gothic nations in earlier times, just as also at the present, but the greatest and most important of all are the Goths, Vandals, Visigoths, and Gepaedes. In ancient times, however, they were named Sauromatae and Melanchlaeni; and there were some too who called these nations Getic." The Getae were considered the same people as the Goths by Jordanes in his Getica written at the middle of the 6th century. He also claims that at one point the "Getae" migrated out of Scandza, while identifying their deity Zalmoxis as a Gothic king. Jordanes assumed the earlier testimony of Orosius. The 9th-century work De Universo of Rabanus Maurus states, "The Massagetae are in origin from the tribe of the Scythians, and are called Massagetae, as if heavy, that is, strong Getae.

=== Suggested link to Jats ===
There have long been attempts to link the Getae and Massagetae to the Jats of South Asia. Likewise, the Dacians have been linked to the Dahae of Central Asia (and the Dahae to the Dasas of South Asia). W. W. Hunter claimed in 1886, suggested that the Jats were an Iranian people – most likely Scythian/Saka in origin, Alexander Cunningham (1888) believed that references in classical European sources – like Strabo, Ptolemy and Pliny – to peoples such as the Zaths, may have been the Getae and/or Jats. More recent authors, like Tadeusz Sulimirski, Weer Rajendra Rishi, and Chandra Chakraberty, have also linked the Getae and Jats.

Less credible, however, are parallel claims by Alexander Cunningham that the Xanthii (or Zanthi) and Iatioi – mentioned by Strabo, Ptolemy and Pliny – may have been synonymous with the Getae and/or Jats. The Xanthii were later established to be a subgroup (tribe or clan) of the Dahae. Subsequent scholars, such as Edwin Pulleyblank, Josef Markwart (also known as Joseph Marquart) and László Torday, suggest that Iatioi may be another name for a people known in classical Chinese sources as the Yuezhi and in South Asian contexts as the Kuṣānas (or Kushans).

== See also ==
- Dacians
- Thracians
- Tomyris
- Massagetae
- Thyssagetae
- Gaut
- Geția, a proposed name for Romania according to the 2025 Romanian coup d'état attempt allegations
- Oium
- Geats
- Crimean Goths
