= Tyragetae =

Tribe of Getae located on the Dniester

The Tyrageti, Tyragetae, or Tyrangitae (Greek: Τυραγγεῖται, Tυραγγέται, or Τυρεγέται, Strabo vii.; Ptol. iii. 5. § 25), literally, the Getae of the Tyras, were a sub-tribe of the Getae, situated on the river Tyras (modern-day Dniester in Moldova and Ukraine). They were regarded as an immigrant tribe of European Sarmatia dwelling east of the river Tyras, near the Carpii and Tagri, and, according to Ptolemy, the northern neighbours of Lower Moesia. Pliny (v. 12. s. 26) calls them, with more correct orthography, Tyragetae, and represents them as dwelling on a large island in the Tyras.
