= Languages of the Roman Empire =

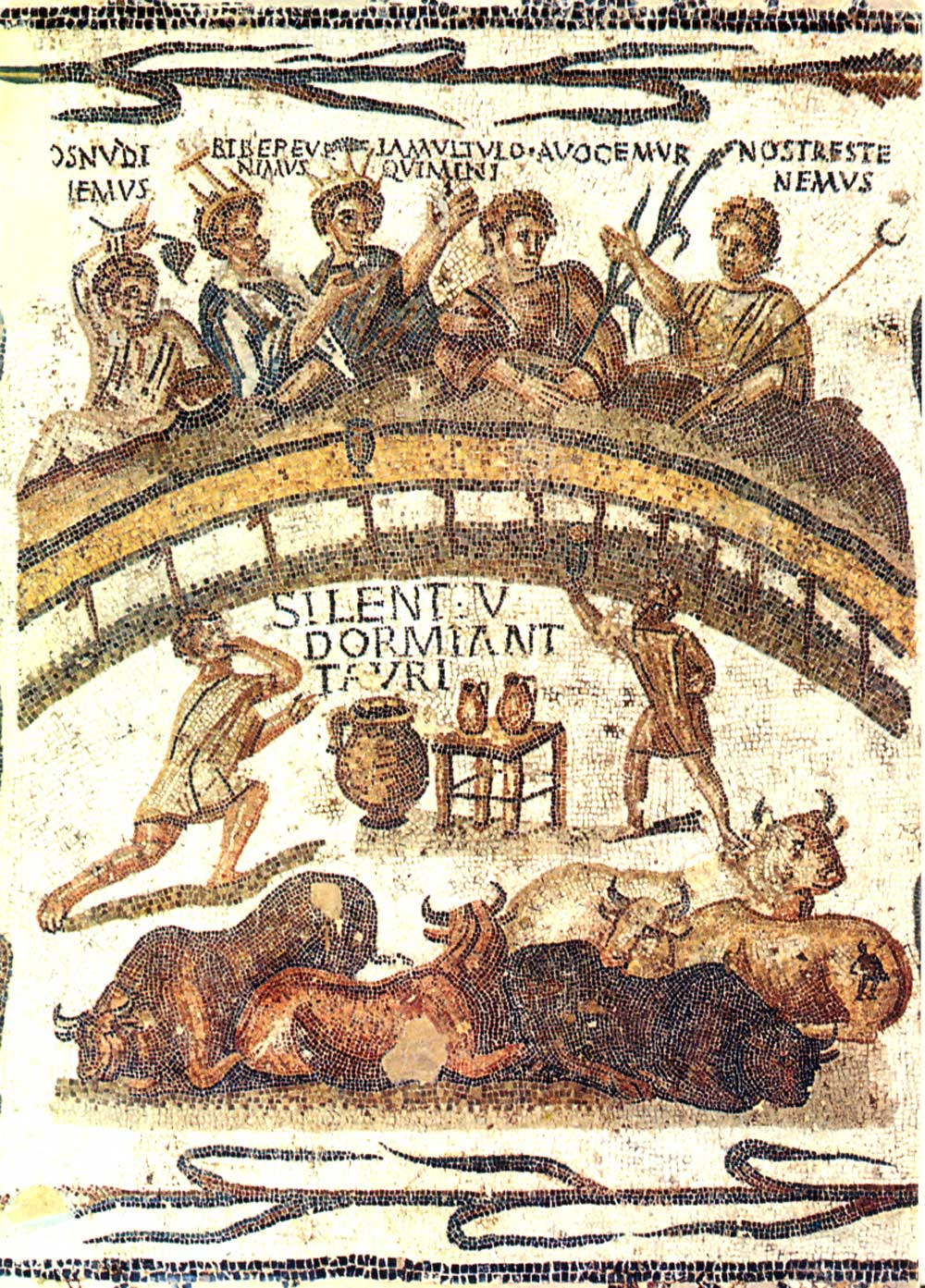
Mosaic (220–250 AD) from El Djem, Tunisia (Roman Africa), with the Latin caption "Silence! Let the bulls sleep" (Silentiu[m] dormiant tauri) and the convivial banter of five banqueters (possibly gladiators) represented as if in speech balloons: "We're going to get naked" ([N]os nudi [f]iemus); – "We came to drink" (Bibere venimus): "Now you're talking a lot" (Ia[m] multu[m] loquimini); "We may be called away" (Avocemur); "We're having three" [drinks] (Nos tres tenemus); The scene may convey a proverbial expression equivalent to both "Let sleeping dogs lie" and "Eat, drink, and be merry, for tomorrow we may die."

Latin and Greek were the dominant languages of the Roman Empire, but other languages were regionally important. Latin was the original language of the Romans and remained the language of imperial administration, legislation, and the military throughout the classical period. In the West, it became the lingua franca and came to be used for even local administration of the cities including the law courts. After all freeborn inhabitants of the Empire were granted universal citizenship in 212 AD, a great number of Roman citizens would have lacked Latin, though they were expected to acquire at least a token knowledge, and Latin remained a marker of "Romanness".

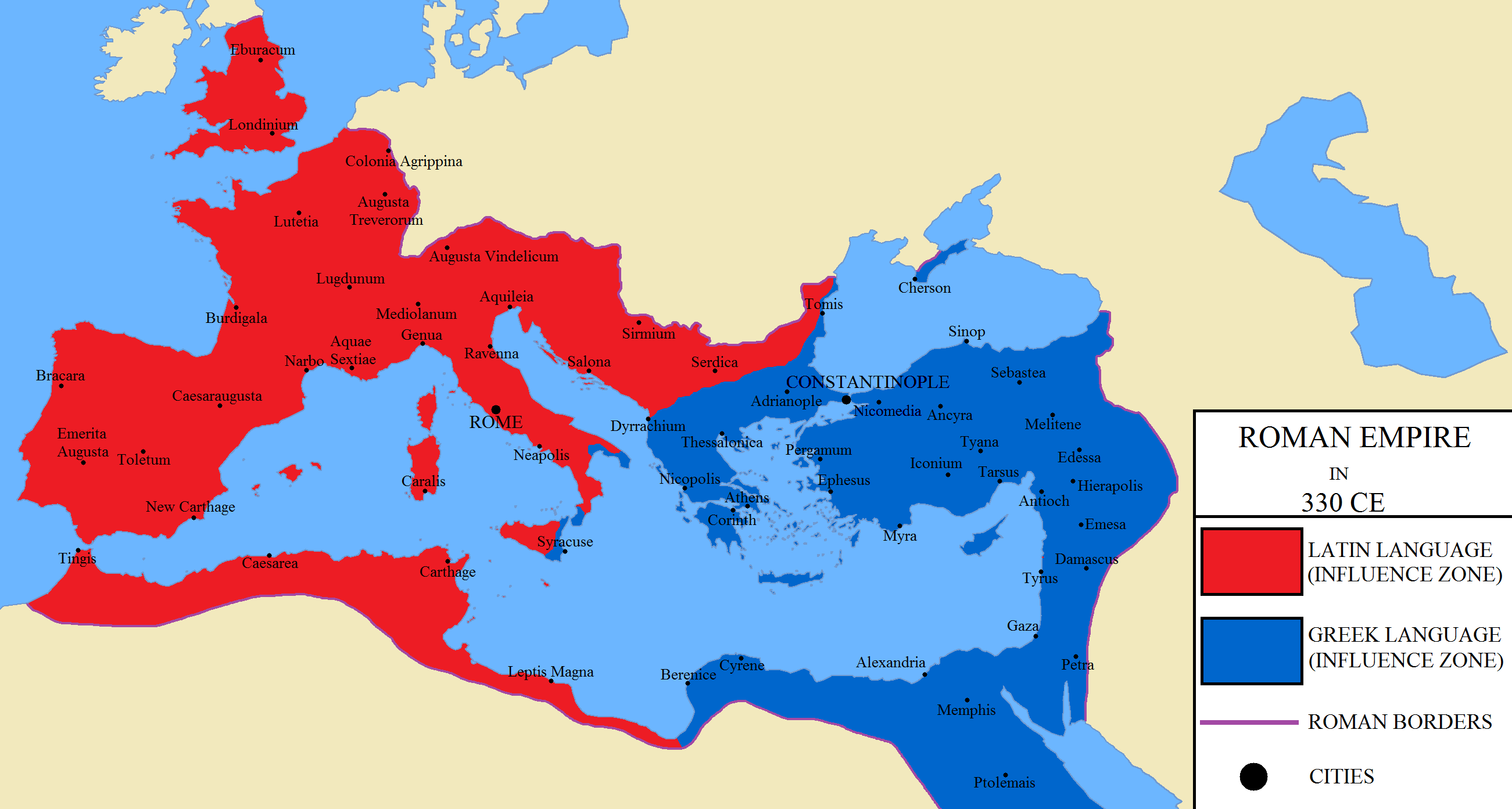
The linguistic division of the Roman Empire, with Latin being predominant in the West, and Greek being predominant in the East.

Koine Greek had become a shared language around the eastern Mediterranean and into Asia Minor as a consequence of the conquests of Alexander the Great. The "linguistic frontier" dividing the Latin West and the Greek East passed through the Balkan Peninsula. Educated Romans, and particularly those of the ruling elite, studied and often achieved a high degree of fluency in Greek, which was useful for diplomatic communications in the East even beyond the borders of the Empire. The international use of Greek was one condition that enabled the spread of Christianity, as indicated for example by the choice of Greek as the language of the New Testament in the Bible and its use for the ecumenical councils of the Christian Roman Empire rather than Latin. With the dissolution of the Empire in the West, Greek became the more dominant language of the Roman Empire in the East, later referred to as the Byzantine Empire.

Because communication in ancient society was predominantly oral, it can be difficult to determine the extent to which regional or local languages continued to be spoken or used for other purposes under Roman rule. Some evidence exists in inscriptions, or in references in Greek and Roman texts to other languages and the need for interpreters. For Punic, Coptic, and Aramaic or Syriac, a significant amount of epigraphy or literature survives. The Palaeo-Balkan languages came into contact with Latin after the Roman expansion in the Adriatic Sea in the 2nd century BC. Of the ancient Balkan languages, aside from Greek, only the precursor of Albanian survived in the Western Balkans, reflecting different chronological layers of Latin influence through contact during the entire period of spoken Latin in the region.

The Celtic languages were widespread throughout much of western Europe, and while the orality of Celtic education left scant written records, Celtic epigraphy is limited in quantity but not rare. The Germanic languages of the Empire have left next to no inscriptions or texts, with the exception of Gothic. Multilingualism contributed to the "cultural triangulation" by means of which an individual who was neither Greek nor Roman might construct an identity through the processes of Romanization and Hellenization.

After the decentralization of political power in late antiquity, Latin developed locally in the Western provinces into branches that became the Romance languages, including Spanish, Portuguese, French, Italian, Catalan, Occitan, Aromanian and Romanian. By the early 21st century, the first or second language of more than a billion people derived from Latin. Latin itself remained an international medium of expression for diplomacy and for intellectual developments identified with Renaissance humanism up to the 17th century, and for law and the Roman Catholic Church to the present.

== Main languages ==
There was never an official language of the empire, however, Latin and Greek were the main languages. During the early years of the Roman Empire, educated nobles often relied on their knowledge of Greek to meet societal expectations, and knowledge of Latin was useful for a career in the military, government, or law. In the east, Greek was the dominant language, a legacy of the Hellenistic period. Greek was also the language of the Christian Church and trade.

Most early emperors were bilingual but had a preference for Latin in the public sphere for political reasons, a practice that first started during the Punic Wars. Classical languages expert Bruno Rochette claims Latin had experienced a period of spread from the second century BC onwards, and especially so in the western provinces, but not as much in the eastern provinces because of Diocletian's reforms: there was a decline in the knowledge of Greek in the west, and Latin was asserted as the language of power in the east.

=== Latin ===
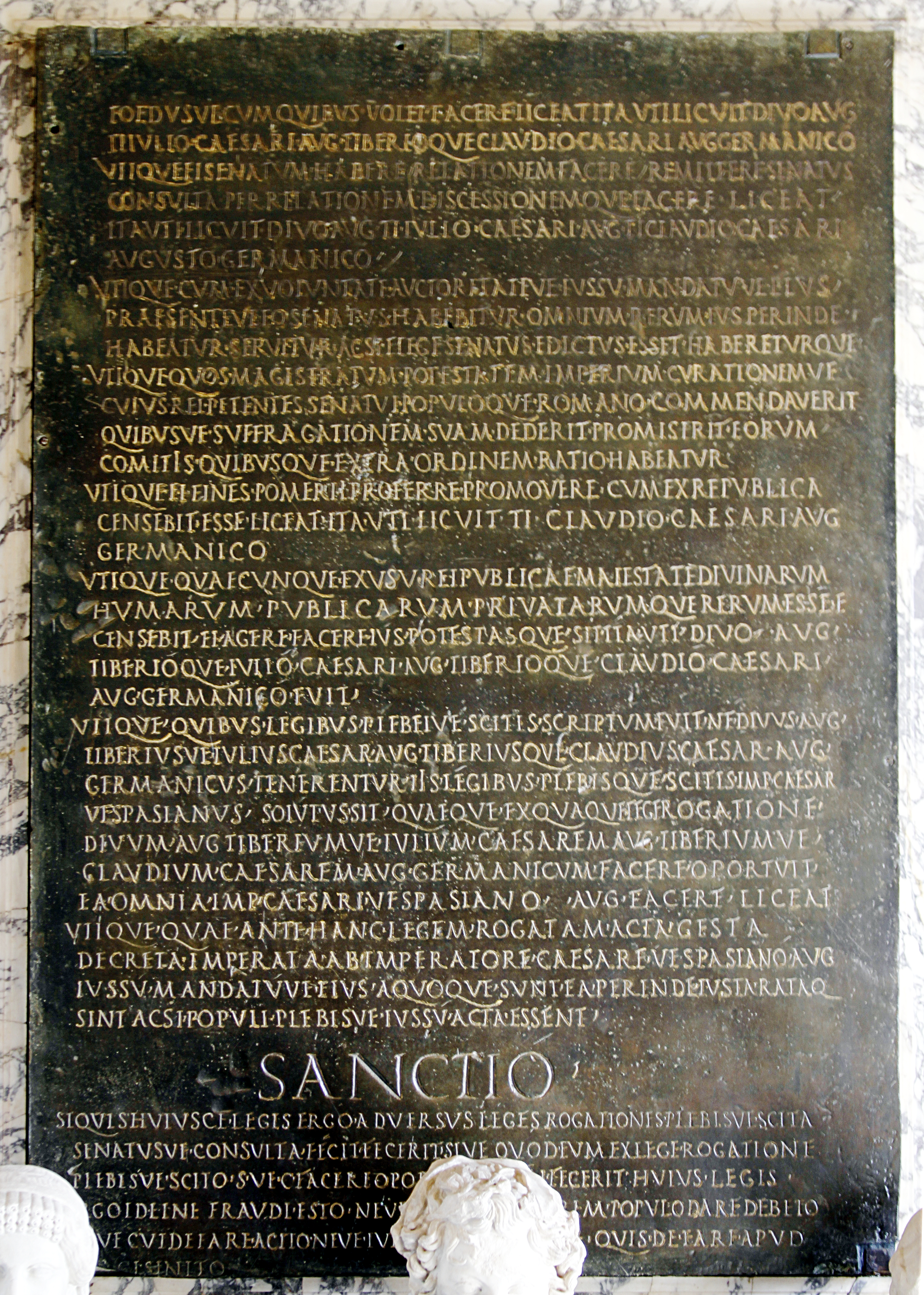
Bronze tablet preserving the text of the senatorial decree in 69 AD recognizing Vespasian as emperor

Latin was the language of the Romans from the earliest known period. Writing under the first Roman emperor Augustus, Virgil emphasizes that Latin was a source of Roman unity and tradition. In Virgil's epic Aeneid about the founding of Rome, the supreme deity Jupiter dictates that the refugee Trojans who have come to settle in Italy will use the language of the native Latini as a means of unification: "they will keep the speech (sermo) and mores of their fathers ... and I will make them all Latins with one mode of expression" (uno ore, literally "with one mouth"). The Julio-Claudian emperors, who claimed descent from the Virgilian hero Aeneas, encouraged high standards of correct Latin (Latinitas), a linguistic movement identified in modern terms as Classical Latin, and favored Latin for conducting official business.

Latin became the language of conquered areas because local people started speaking it, and not because the population was displaced by Latin-speakers. Latin was not imposed officially on peoples brought under Roman rule. Saint Augustine observed that Romans preferred for Latin to be adopted per pacem societatis, through a social pact. This language policy contrasts with that of Alexander, who aimed to impose Greek throughout his empire as the official language. Latin was not a requirement for Roman citizenship, and there was no state-supported schooling that privileged it as the medium for education: fluency was desirable for its "high cultural, political, legal, social and economic value".

Latin was needed for imperial service and advancement, and was the language used for the internal functioning of government. Edicts and official communications of the emperor were in Latin, including rulings on local laws that might be in another language.

The Romans placed a high value on the written word, as indicated by their obsession with documentation and public inscriptions. The Imperial bureaucracy was so dependent on writing that the Babylonian Talmud (bT Shabbat 11a) declared "if all seas were ink, all reeds were pen, all skies parchment, and all men scribes, they would be unable to set down the full scope of the Roman government's concerns." Estimates of the average literacy rate in the Empire range from 5 to 30 percent or higher, depending in part on the definition of "literacy". The lack of state intervention in access to education was a barrier to literacy, since formal education was available only to children from families who could pay for it.

The birth certificates and wills of Roman citizens had to be written in Latin until the time of Alexander Severus (reigned 222–235). Illiterate Roman subjects would have someone such as a government scribe (scriba) read or write their official documents for them. Laws and edicts were posted in writing as well as read out. Public art and religious ceremonies were ways to communicate imperial ideology regardless of language spoken or ability to read. An early form of story ballet (pantomimus) was brought to Rome by Greek performers and became popular throughout the multilingual empire in part because it relied on gesture rather than verbal expression.

Latin was the official language of the Roman army until the mid-6th century, and remained the most common language for military use even in the Eastern empire until the 630s. By contrast, only two bishops are known to have spoken Latin at the ecumenical councils held during the reign of Theodosius II (d. 450 AD).

=== Greek ===
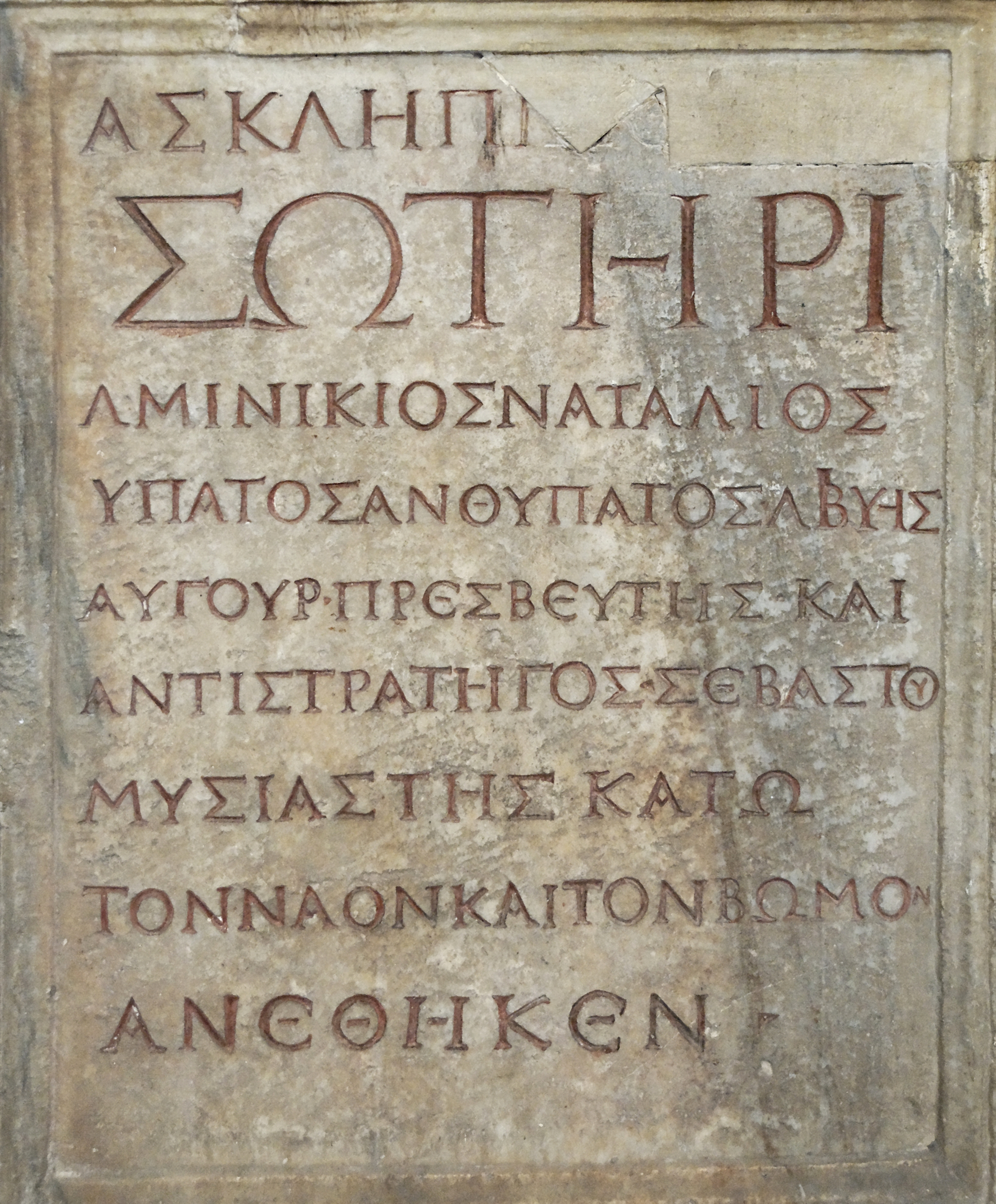
Greek dedication on an altar to Asclepius the Savior by the Roman consul Lucius Minucius Natalis (133–134 AD)

Koine Greek had become the common language of the eastern Mediterranean and into Asia Minor after the conquests of Alexander the Great. Lucian even imagines that Greek is the universal language of the dead in the underworld. In late antiquity, a Greek-speaking majority lived in the Greek peninsula and islands, major cities of the East, and most of Anatolia. Greek continued as the language of the Eastern Roman Empire, and developed into a distinctive medieval Greek that gave rise to modern Greek.

The emperor Claudius tried to limit the use of Greek, and on occasion revoked the citizenship of those who lacked Latin. Even in addressing the Roman Senate, however, he drew on his own bilingualism in communicating with Greek-speaking ambassadors. Suetonius quotes him as referring to "our two languages," and the employment of two imperial secretaries, one for Greek and one Latin, dates to his reign.

The everyday interpenetration of the two languages is indicated by bilingual inscriptions, which sometimes even switch back and forth between Greek and Latin. The epitaph of a Greek-speaking soldier, for instance, might be written primarily in Greek, with his rank and unit in the Roman army expressed in Latin.

In the Eastern empire, laws and official documents were regularly translated into Greek from Latin. Both languages were in active use by government officials and the Church during the 5th century. From the 6th century, Greek culture was studied in the West almost exclusively through Latin translation. Latin loanwords appear liberally in Greek texts on technical topics from late antiquity and the Byzantine period.

== Language reform movements ==
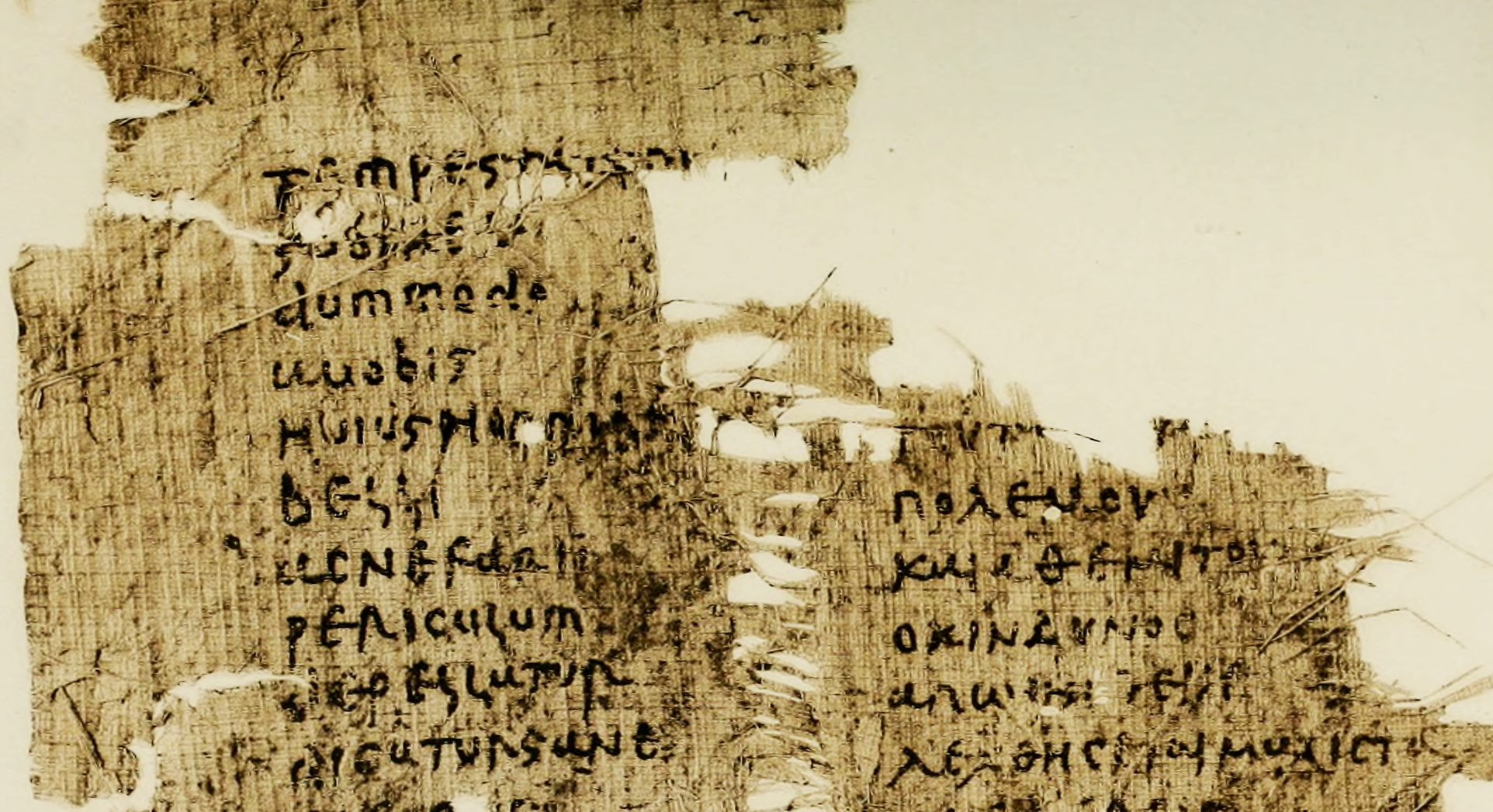
A 5th-century papyrus showing a parallel Latin-Greek text of a speech by Cicero

Atticism was a trend of the Second Sophistic. Intellectuals such as Aelius Aristides sought to restore the standards of classical Greek characteristic of the Attic dialect, represented by Thucydides, Plato, Demosthenes, and other authors from the Classical period. Prose stylists who aspired to Atticism tried to avoid the vulgarisms of koine—an impractical goal, but this linguistic purism also reflected the 2nd-century flourishing of grammarians and lexicographers. Expertise in language and literature contributed to preserving Hellenic culture in the Roman Imperial world.

Among other reforms, the emperor Diocletian (reigned 284–305) sought to renew the authority of Latin, and the Greek expression ἡ κρατοῦσα διάλεκτος (hē kratousa dialektos) attests to the continuing status of Latin as "the language of power." The scholar Libanius (4th century) regarded Latin as causing a decline in the quality of Greek rhetoric. In the early 6th century, the emperor Justinian engaged in a quixotic effort to reassert the status of Latin as the language of law, even though in his time Latin no longer held any currency as a living language in the East.

== Regional languages ==
The dominance of Latin and Greek among the literate elite may obscure the continuity of spoken languages, since all cultures within the Roman Empire were predominantly oral. In areas where Syriac, Coptic, and Aramaic were spoken, they coexisted with Greek.

=== Aramaic and Syriac ===
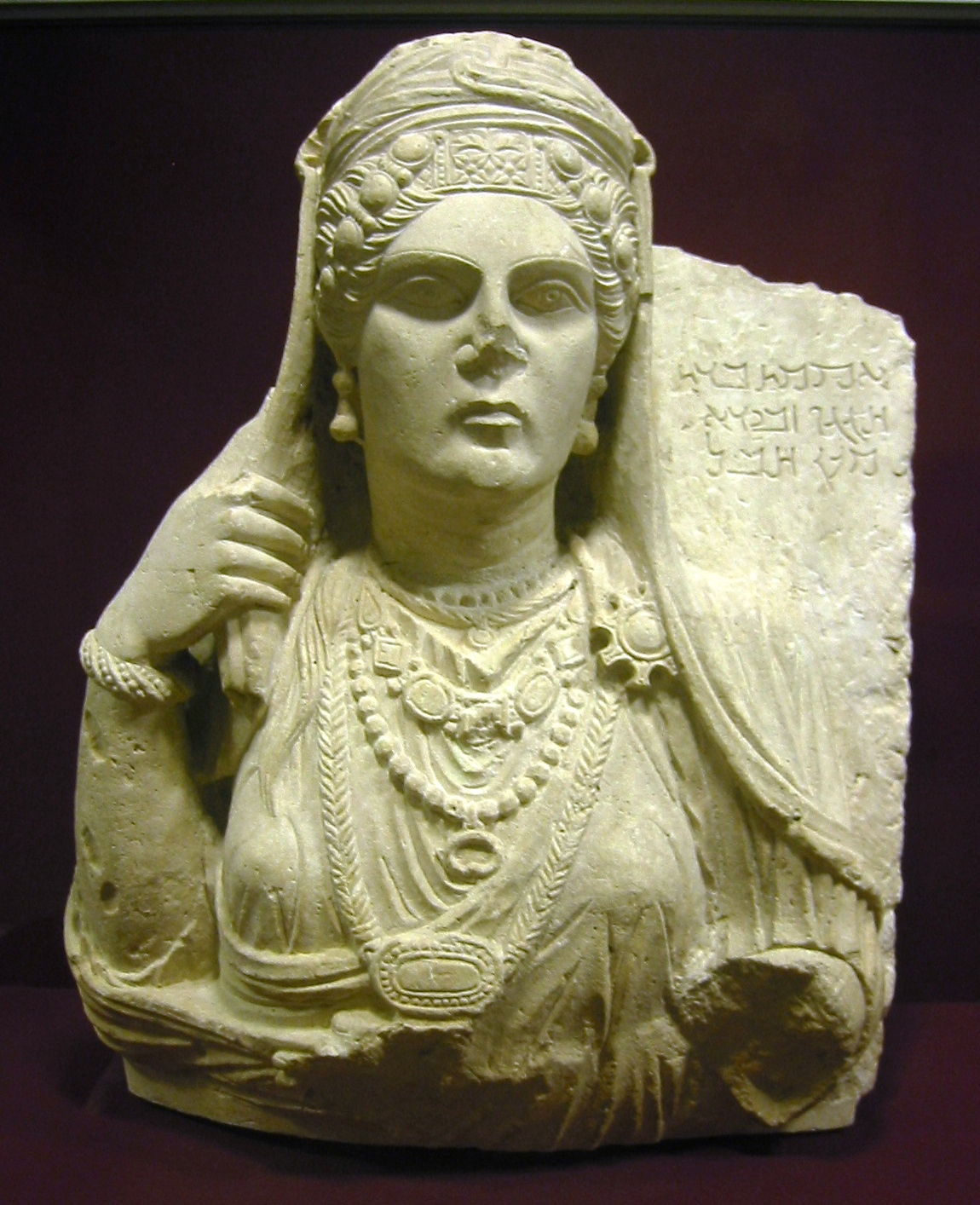
Funerary bust (2nd century AD) of Aqmat, a Syrian woman, with an inscription in Palmyrene Aramaic

Aramaic was the primary language of Syria and Mesopotamia, with several dialects. Syriac was in use around Antioch, one of the three largest cities of the Empire, and particularly by Christians. Syriac literature is known from the latter 2nd century, spreading from the Christian community in Edessa. Early Syriac literature was produced in a largely Greek intellectual milieu until the 4th century, but was distinctive for its use of rich symbolism and emphasis on verse forms, and influenced Greek writers such as Eusebius, Basil and Theodoret. Among the earliest Syriac literature was the Diatessaron of Tatian, and translations of sections from the Bible.

The prolific Syrian scholar Bardesanes knew Greek and sent his son for schooling in Athens, but chose to write in his ethnic language. In addition to Syriac homilies and treatises, Bardesanes wrote 150 hymns "of enormous influence and doubtful doctrine". Other Syriac literature of the time included Christian treatises, dialogues, and apocryphal Acts. Some Syriac literature had Gnostic elements, and also played a role in the dissemination of Manicheanism. From the 5th century onward, it included Monophysite and Nestorian writings.

Works by the Syriac writer Ephraim were translated into Greek. The satirist and rhetorician Lucian came from Samosata in the province of Syria; although he wrote in Greek, he calls himself a Syrian, and a reference to himself as a "barbarian" suggests that he spoke Syriac.

Soldiers from Palmyra even used Palmyrene Aramaic, the dialect native to Palmyra, for inscriptions, in a striking exception to the rule that Latin was the language of the military.

=== Coptic ===
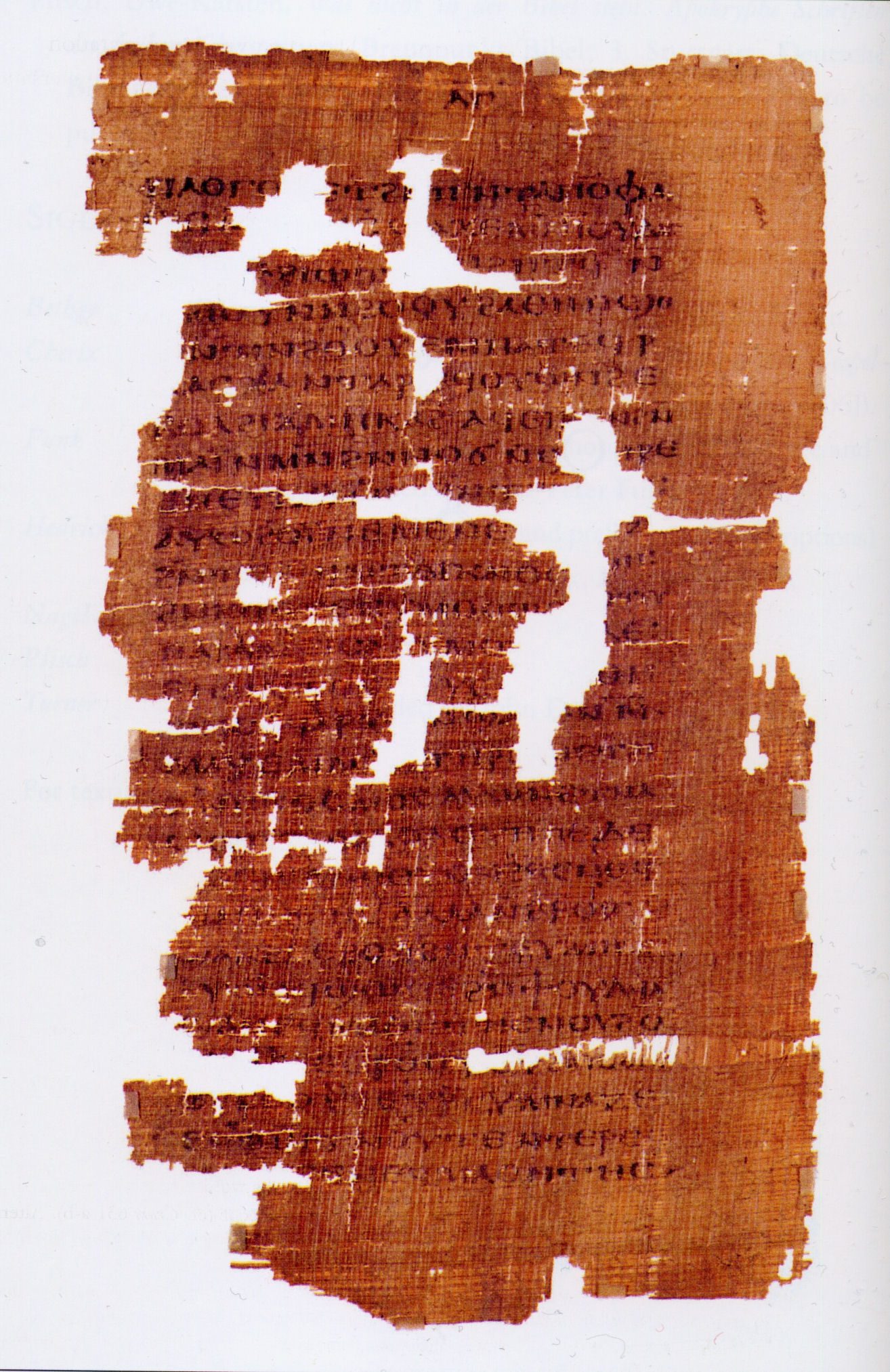
First page of the Gospel of Judas in the Coptic Codex Tchacos (3rd–4th century AD)

"Coptic" is the modern term for the form of ancient Egyptian that had developed in late antiquity. Written Coptic as a literary language seems to have resulted from a conscious effort among Egypt's educated class to revive their cultural heritage.

In the 4th century, Coptic script—based on the Greek alphabet with additional characters from Egyptian demotic to reflect Egyptian phonology—is found in documents in several dialects, including Old Bohairic, Fayumic, Achmimic, and Sahidic. At this time Coptic emerged as a fully literary language, including major translations of Greek scriptures, liturgical texts, and patristic works. From the 4th to 7th centuries, original works—including homilies, saints' lives, monastic rules, letters, and exhortations—were composed in Coptic, primarily in the Sahidic dialect. As a writing system, Coptic was used for everyday purposes such as inventories and real estate transactions, as well as for poetry. By the 640s, when Egypt came under Arab rule, Coptic-speaking Christians constituted the majority of the population. At the end of the 7th century, legal texts might still be written in Coptic: in one example, a bilingual Greek-Arabic protocol with a reference to Mohammed precedes a document entirely in Coptic that invokes the Trinity.

=== Punic ===
Punic, the Semitic language of the Carthaginians, continued to be used in North Africa during the Imperial period. Before the Roman conquest in 146 BC, nearly all Punic inscriptions had been votives to the deities Tanit and Ba'al or funerary commemorations, but during the Roman era a broader range of content is found in Neo-Punic, often appearing with parallel texts in Latin or Greek. A striking occurrence of Neo-Punic is found at the otherwise thoroughly Roman temple of Roma and Augustus, built 14–19 AD at Leptis Magna. One of the latest Neo-Punic inscriptions on a monument dates to the reign of Domitian (81–96 AD). No inscription in Punic script on stone can be dated later than the 2nd or 3rd century. Latin script was used to write Punic in the 4th and 5th centuries.

Punic was spoken at the highest level of society: the emperor Septimius Severus (reigned 193–211) was born in Leptis Magna and spoke Punic as well as Latin and Greek, while his sister supposedly had little command of Latin at all. Augustine, who was from North Africa, several times mentions Punic; he observed that it was related to Hebrew and Syriac, and his knowledge of Punic helped him figure out transliterated Semitic words from the Bible.

=== Celtic ===
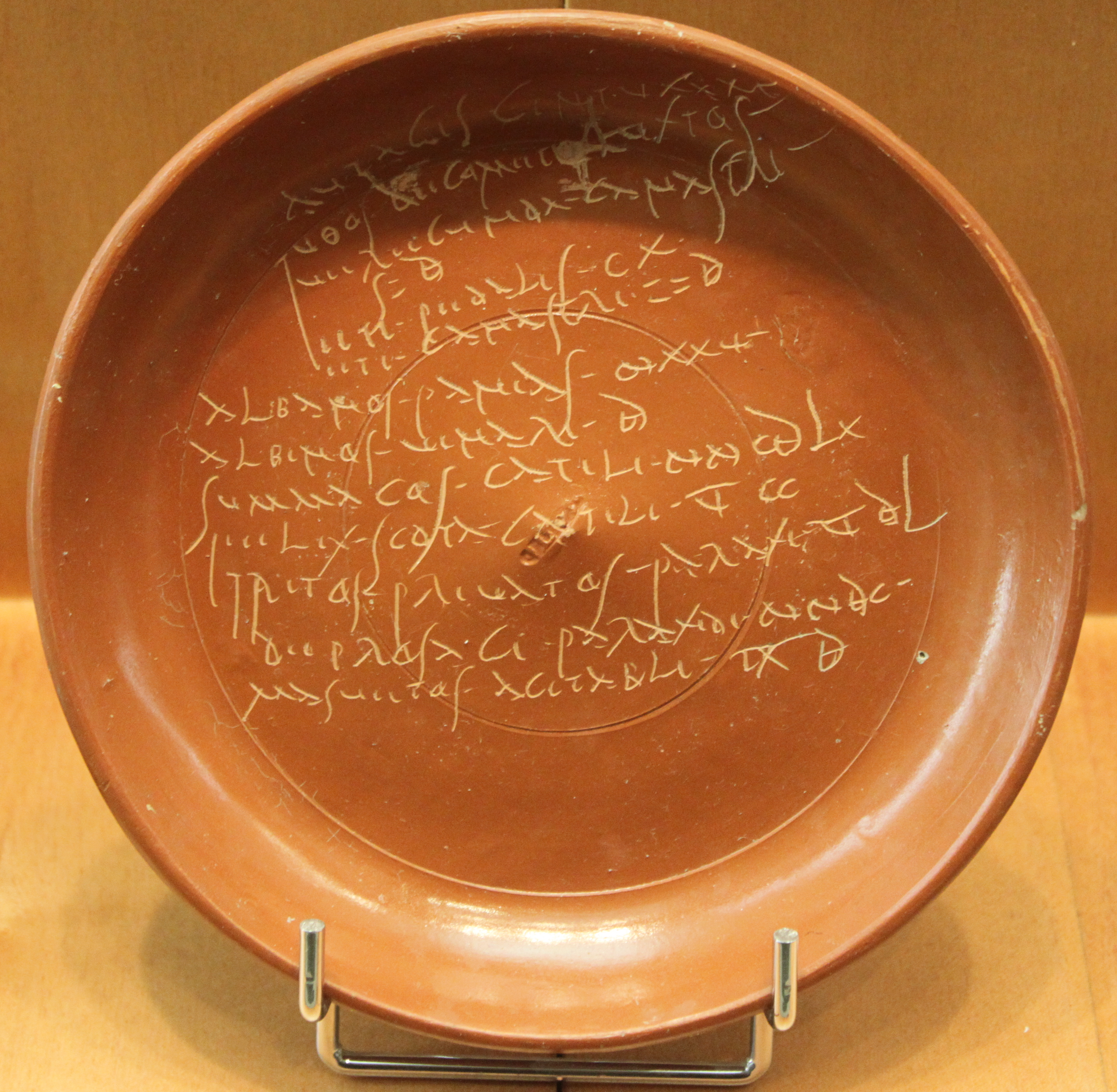
Gaulish written in Latin cursive on terra sigillata from La Graufesenque in Roman Gaul

Celtic languages at the beginning of the Imperial period include Gaulish, spoken in Gaul (Gallia, present-day France, Belgium, Switzerland and northwestern Italy); Celtiberian and Gallaecian, in parts of Hispania (Spain and Portugal); Brittonic in Britannia (Roman Britain), and Galatian, a branch of Celtic brought to Anatolia by the Gallic invasions of the 3rd century BC. The place name Galatia, a Roman province, derives from the Greek word for "Gauls" or "Celts", Galatai. Loanwords from Gaulish are recorded in Latin as early as the time of Ennius (ca. 239–169 BC), due to the presence of Celtic settlements on the Italian peninsula. By late antiquity, some Gaulish words had become so Latinized that their origin was no longer recognized as such.

Celtiberian is documented as a written language only after contact with the Romans in the 2nd century BC. Of 103 Celtiberian inscriptions, thirty in Iberian script are hospitality tokens (tesserae hospitales), twenty of which are in the shape of animals. The social custom of pledging mutual support among families or communities was compatible with hospitium in Roman culture, and the Celtiberians continued to produce the tokens, though switching to Latin, into the 2nd century of the Imperial era. Under Augustus, the territory of the Celtiberians became part of the Tarraconensis province. Written Celtiberian ceases early in the reign of Augustus, if not before.

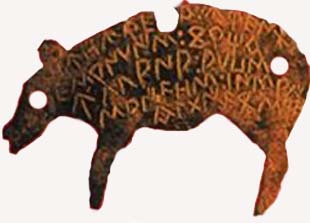
Celtiberian inscription on a hospitality token from the Republican period

Several references to Gaulish in late antiquity may indicate that it continued to be spoken. Irenaeus, bishop of Lugdunum (present-day Lyon) from 177 AD, complains that he has to communicate with his parishioners in their "barbarous tongue", probably Gaulish. The jurist Ulpian (170–228) mentions the need to recognize Gaulish verbal contracts. Lampridius says that a druidess made a prophecy in Gaulish to Alexander Severus (208–235). Jerome (331–420), who had first-hand knowledge, observes that the Gallic Treveri speak a language "more or less the same" as that of the Galatians. The collection of pharmacological recipes by Marcellus of Bordeaux (late 4th or early 5th century) contains several Gaulish words, mainly plant names, and seems to indicate that the language remained in use for at least some purposes such as traditional medicine and magic. Sulpicius Severus (363–425), also from Gallia Aquitania, takes note of Gaulish-Latin bilingualism, with Gaulish as the first language. Other mentions of people who speak "in the Gallic manner" (gallice) or similar may refer to speaking Latin with a regional Gaulish accent. Historical linguistics demonstrates that Gaulish coexisted with Latin throughout the era of Roman rule, and evidence in the writings of Gregory of Tours (538–594) indicates that Gaulish might have been spoken in France into the latter 6th century.

=== Germanic ===
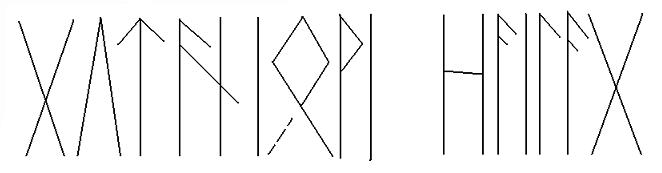
Transcribed runic inscription from the Buzău torc (250–400 AD), found in Dacia amid a Gothic treasure hoard

Next to nothing is recorded of the Germanic languages spoken in the Empire, with the exception of Gothic. A phrase of Gothic is quoted in an elegiac couplet from the Latin Anthology, and more substantially parts of the Gospels were translated into Gothic and preserved by the 6th-century Codex Argenteus. While Latin gained some Germanic loanwords, most linguistic influence ran the other way.

Bilingualism in a Germanic language and Latin was especially important in the military for officers in command of units recruited from Germanic-speaking areas. Tacitus observes that Arminius, the Cheruscan officer who later led a disastrously successful rebellion against the Romans, was bilingual. The emperor Julian employed a bilingual Germanic military tribune as a spy. The officers and secretaries who kept the records preserved in the Vindolanda tablets were Batavian, but their Latin contains no hint; the common soldiers of their units, however, may have retained their Germanic speech.

Less commonly, Latin-speaking officers learned a Germanic language through their service and acted as interpreters. Acquiring Germanic might be regarded as a dubious achievement inducing anxieties of "barbarism": in 5th-century Gaul, Sidonius Apollinaris thinks it funny that his learned friend Syagrius has become fluent in Germanic.

=== Palaeo-Balkanic ===
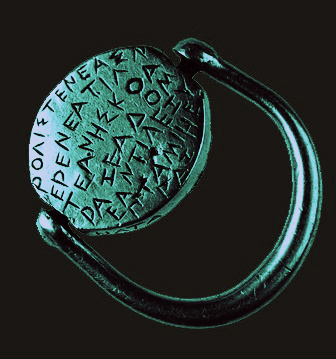
The Ring of Ezerovo is one of four extant Thracian inscriptions

The Palaeo-Balkan languages were divided into Illyrian, Thracian, and Dacian, all of which were spoken to the north of Greek-speaking regions. Speakers of these languages would have come into contact with Latin around the 3rd and 2nd centuries BC. Palaeo-Balkanic is poorly attested in writing and exists as single words or names on vessels and other artifacts. The only Thracian inscriptions have been found exclusively in the Bulgarian villages of Ezerovo, Kyolmen, and Duvanlii.

Of the non-Hellenic languages indigenous to the Balkans, only Proto-Albanian produced a linguistic descendant that survives into the present. Contemporary Albanian may be most closely related to the extinct Messapic, the pre-Roman, non-Italic language of Apulia. Proto-Albanian received a major influx of Latin vocabulary throughout the centuries as its territorial extent fell mostly to the north of the Jireček Line.

== Multilingualism ==
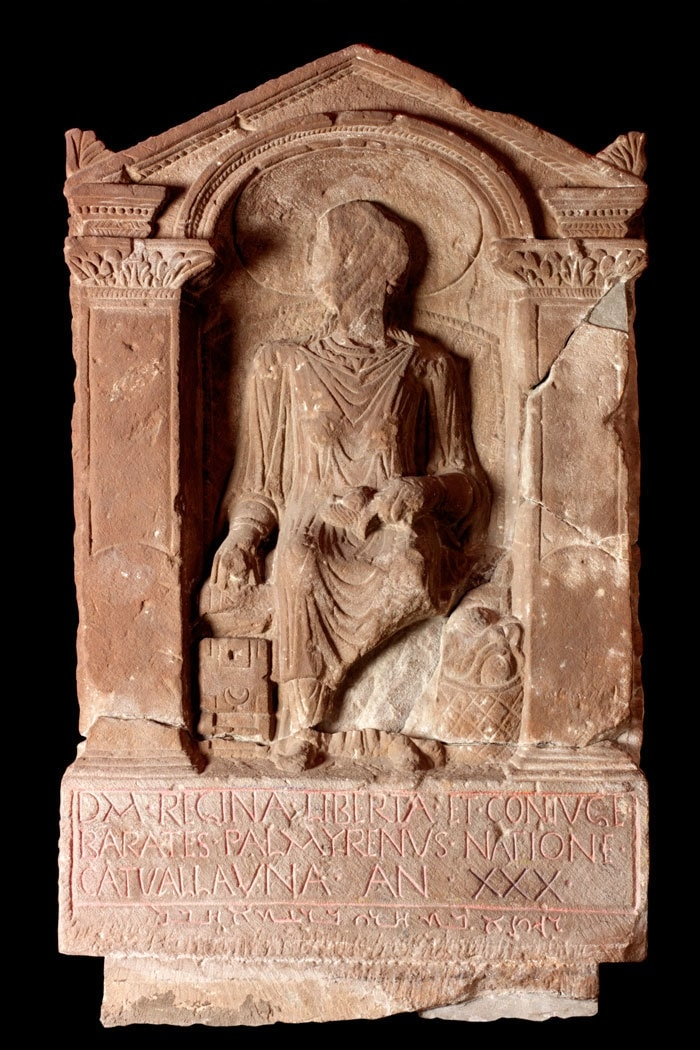
Tombstone from Roman Britain, inscribed in Latin and Palmyrene Aramaic, for Regina of the Celtic Catuvellauni

Trilingualism was perhaps not uncommon among educated people who came from regions where a language other than Latin or Greek was spoken. The Latin novelist Apuleius also wrote in Greek, and had learned Punic from his mother. The Babatha Archive is a suggestive example of practical multilingualism. These papyri, named for a Jewish woman in the province of Arabia and dating from 93 to 132 AD, mostly employ Aramaic, the local language, written in Greek characters with Semitic and Latin influences; a petition to the Roman governor, however, was written in Greek.

One striking example of multilingualism as well as multiculturalism in the Empire is a 2nd-century epitaph for a woman named Regina, discovered in 1878 near the Roman fort at South Shields, northeast England. The inscription is written in Latin and Palmyrene Aramaic, the language of Regina's husband, Barates, who has been identified with a standardbearer (vexillarius) of that name from Palmyra, Syria. He was most likely in the military stationed along Hadrian's Wall. The Latin, however, is constructed grammatically in the manner of Greek honorific inscriptions typical of Palmyra, suggesting that Barates was bilingual in Aramaic and Greek, and added Latin as a third language. The Latin portion is larger and longer, and provides most of the information. The Palmyrene is carved in a fluid cursive script, and conveys only the name of Regina and an expression of grief. Since few people in Britain could have read Palmyrene, its use may be Barates' personal statement of his identity and emotions. A fourth linguistic element is the name Regina, which can be either Latin or Celtic. Such names seem often to have been chosen for their deliberate duality. Regina herself is identified as from the British Catuvellauni, a people whose civitas capital was Verulamium, but the Gallo-Brittonic spelling Catuallauna (feminine) is used in the Latin inscription.

== Geographical distribution ==
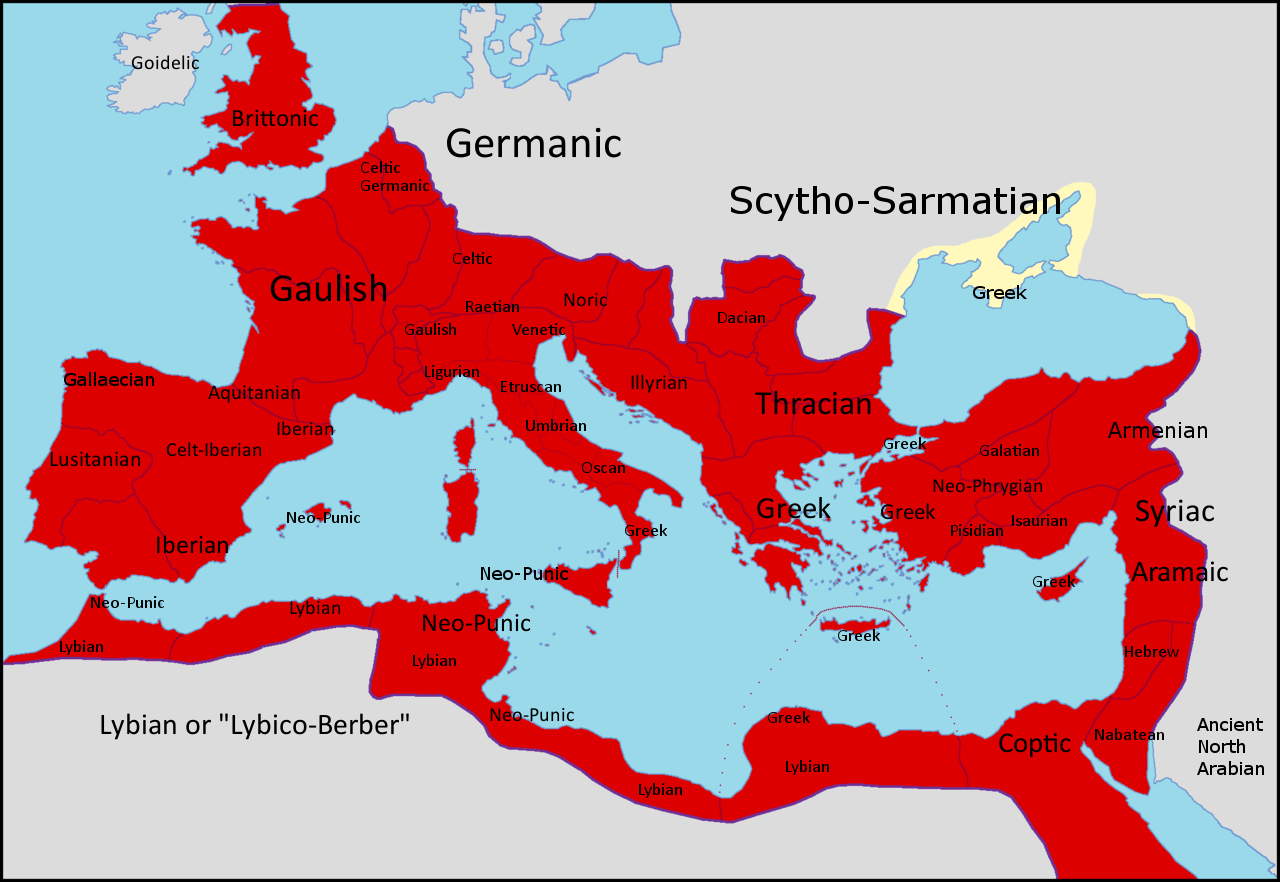
Map of the regional languages of the empire c. 150 AD

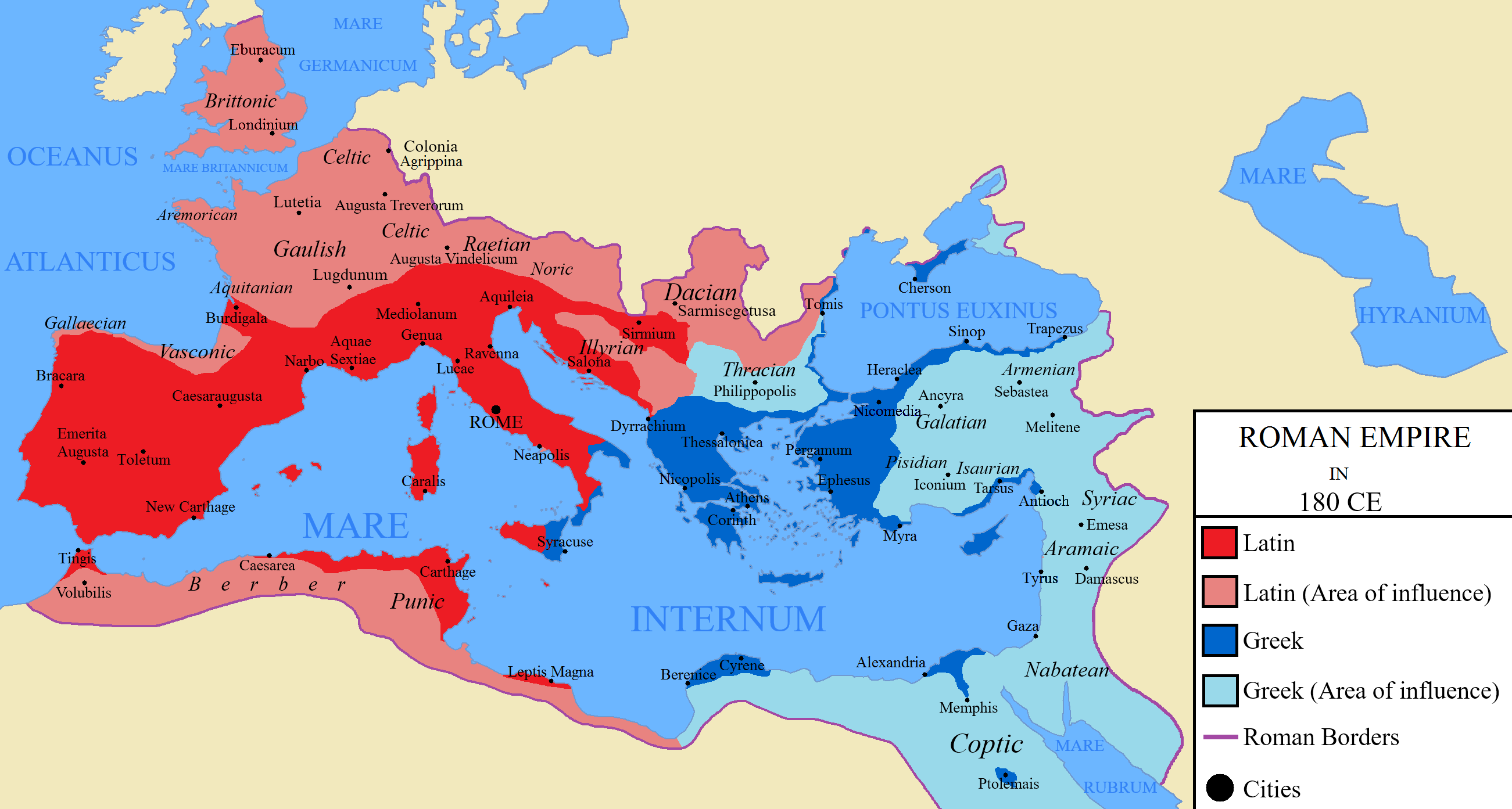
Map of the Roman Empire in 180 AD with the regional languages.

=== Italian Peninsula and Sicily ===
In Italy, the written use of Latin had replaced Oscan—like Latin, an Italic language—and Etruscan by the end of the 1st century AD. Oscan graffiti are preserved by the eruption of Vesuvius in AD 79 at Pompeii and Herculaneum, which was in the Oscan region, and a couple may date before or after an earlier regional earthquake in AD 62. In the mid-1st century, the emperor Claudius, who had keen antiquarian interests, knew Etruscan and wrote a multi-volume history of the Etruscans, but the work has not survived.

Multilingualism had been characteristic of Sicily for centuries, resulting from occupations by the Carthaginians, Greeks, and Romans. While the slave trade during the Republican period brought speakers of Greek and other languages from the East to the island, Greek was the language of higher-status persons such as government officials and businessmen during the Imperial era. Immigration to Sicily in the early Empire originated more often in places where Latin was spoken than in Greek-speaking areas. African speakers of Latin were a significant presence in Sicily. Christian inscriptions are far more likely to be in Greek. In late antiquity, Greek-Latin bilingualism was common enough that it would have been acquired through everyday personal interaction. The Jewish communities of Syracuse seem to have been bilingual in Greek and Hebrew. There is some Sicilian evidence of Syriac.

=== Western provinces ===
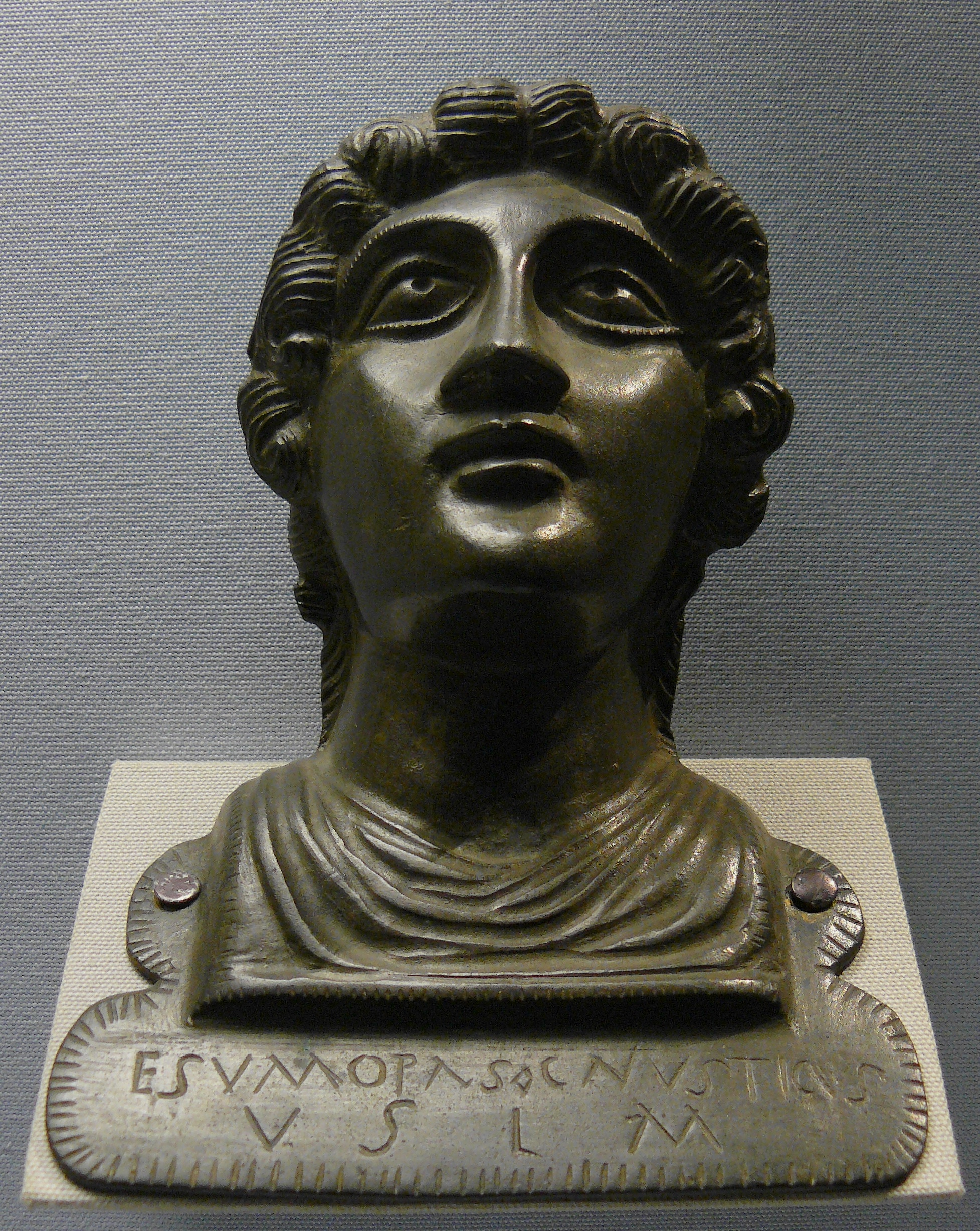
Votive bust (late 1st century AD) with the Gaulish name Esumopas Cnustious and the Latin abbreviation VSLM (votum solvit libens merito, "fulfilled his vow freely, as is deserved")

In the Western Empire, Latin gradually replaced the Celtic languages, which were related to it by a shared Indo-European origin. Commonalities in syntax and vocabulary facilitated the adoption of Latin. Mediterranean Gaul (southern France) had become trilingual (Greek, Latin, Gaulish) by the mid-1st century BC. The importance of Latin in gaining access to the ruling power structure caused the rapid extinction of inscriptions in scripts that had been used to represent local languages on the Iberian Peninsula (Hispania) and in Gaul. Among other aspects of a distinctive Gallo-Roman culture was the creation of Gallo-Latin text. In Latin commemorative inscriptions, individuals with Celtic names rarely identify themselves as "Celtic" or "Gallic"; they are much more likely to name the people of their civitas (such as Aedui, Remi, Pictones) or their voting tribe (tribus) as Roman citizens. Several major writers of Latin came from the Iberian Peninsula in the Imperial period, including Seneca, Lucan, Quintilian, Martial, and Prudentius. Spoken Gaulish seems to have survived in Gaul into the late 6th century, as evidenced in the development of Gallo-Romance languages.

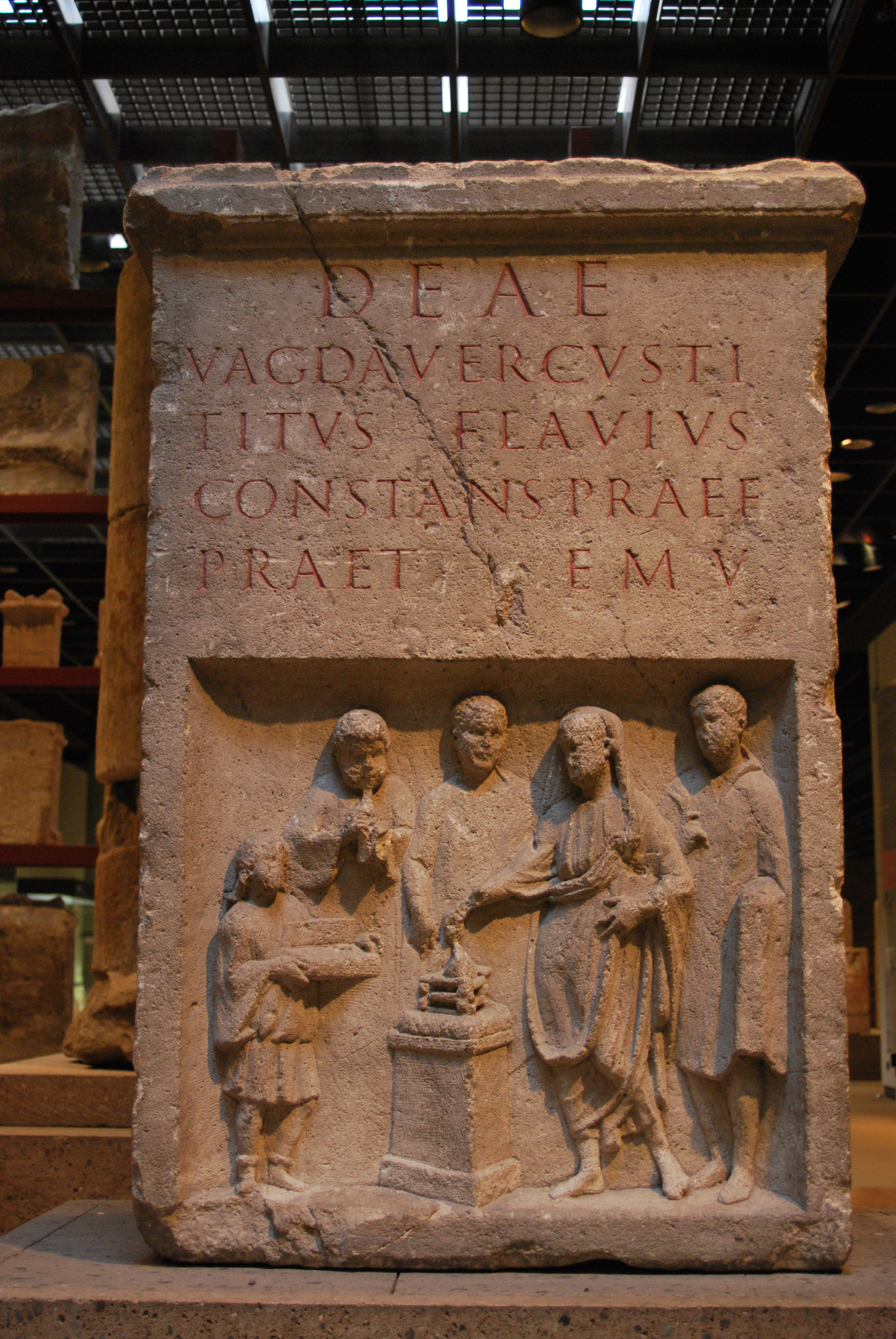
Roman sacrifice on an altar with a Latin dedication to the Germanic or Celtic goddess Vagdavercustis, set up by a praetorian prefect in 165 AD at Colonia Ubiorum (Cologne, Germany)

Most of the 136 Greek inscriptions from Mediterranean Gaul (the Narbonensis), including those from originally Greek colonies, are post-Augustan. Their content indicates that Greek was used increasingly for specialized purposes: "education, medicine, acting, agonistic activities, art, magic, religion, including Christianity". Inscriptions from Marseille (ancient Massilia), founded as a Greek Phocaean colony around 600 BC, show the continued use of Greek, especially in education and medicine, into the 2nd and 3rd centuries of the Imperial era. In the 4th century, the Latin poet and scholar Ausonius, from Gallia Aquitania (present-day Bordeaux), characterizes his physician father as speaking Attic Greek with more eloquence than Latin.

Basque, not an Indo-European language, survived in the region of the Pyrenees. The people of southwestern Gaul and northeastern Hispania (roughly present-day Aquitaine and Navarre) were regarded by Julius Caesar as ethnically distinct from the Celts, and the Aquitanian language they spoke was Vasconic like Basque, judging from place names. The Aquitani adopted Latin under Roman rule.

Latin did not become as deeply entrenched in the province of Britannia, and may have dwindled rapidly after the Roman withdrawal around 410 AD, although pockets of Latin-speaking Britons survived in western Britain until about 700 AD. The evidence of Latin loanwords into Brittonic suggests that the Latin of Roman Britain was academic, in contrast to the everyday conversational Latin ("Vulgar" Latin) on the continent.

=== African provinces ===
In the provinces of Africa westwards of Cyrenaica (a region colonized by Greeks since the 7th century BC), the people of Carthage and other Phoenician colonies spoke and wrote Punic, with Latin common in urban centers. Other Roman Africans spoke Afroasiatic languages (Libyan, Numidian), debatably early versions of Berber.

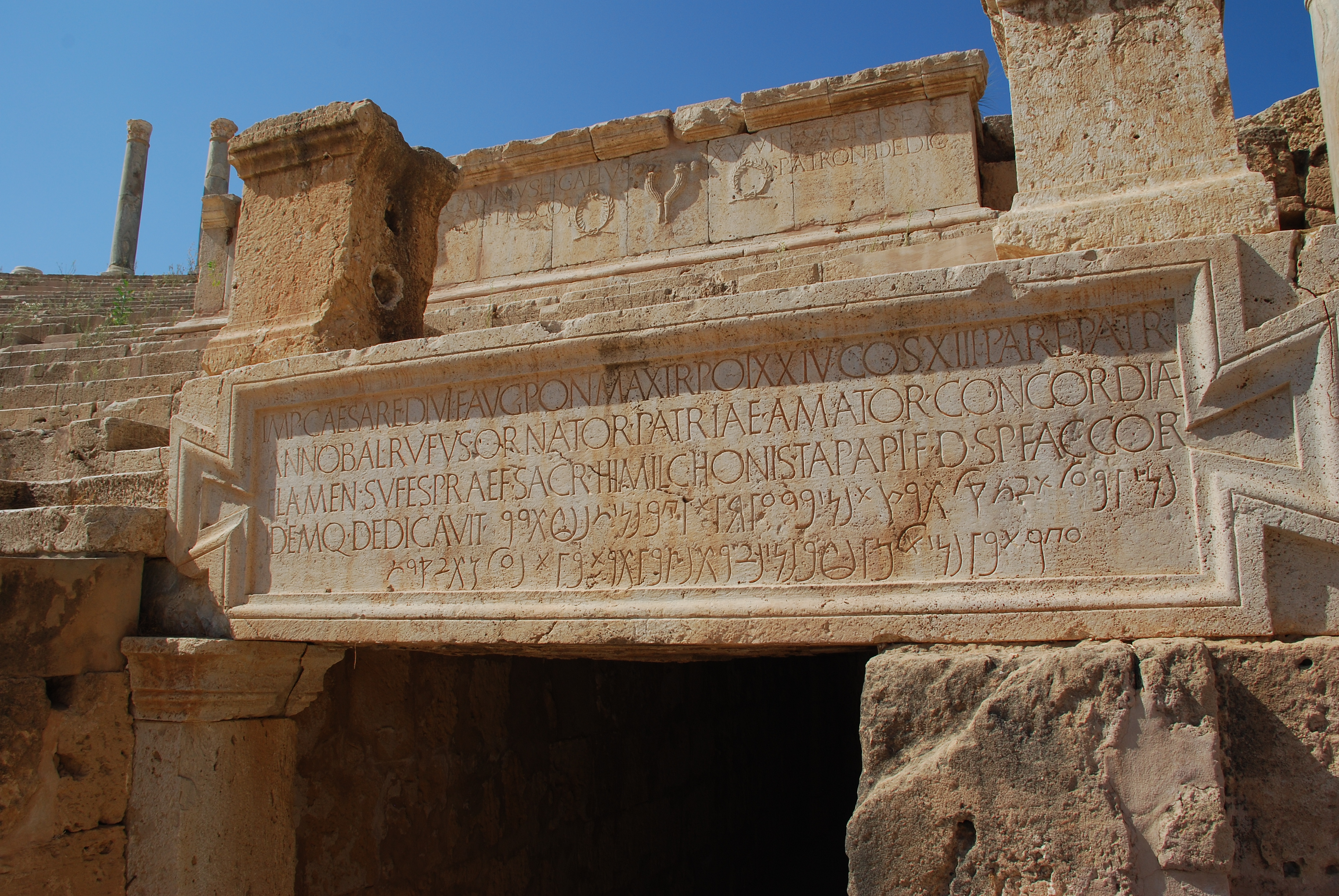
Bilingual Latin-Punic inscription at the theatre in Leptis Magna in present-day Libya

Punic was used for legends on coins during the time of Tiberius (1st century AD), and Punic inscriptions appear on public buildings into the 2nd century, some bilingual with Latin. Inscriptions might also be trilingual: one pertaining to Imperial cult presents "the official Latin, the local Punic, and the Greek of passing traders and an educated or cosmopolitan elite".

Inscriptions in Libyan use a script similar to tifinagh, usually written vertically from the bottom up. The 23 characters are "of a rather rigid geometric form". Bilingual examples are found with either Punic or Latin, and indicate that some people who could write these languages could also at least transliterate their names into the Libyan script. Although Libyan inscriptions are concentrated southeast of Hippo, near the present-day Algerian-Tunisia border, their distribution overall suggests that knowledge of the language was not confined to isolated communities.

Latin loanwords point to the effects of language leveling on Proto-Berber in the first and second centuries. Regional developments in technologies such as ploughing and the use of the camel as a pack animal were accelerated by North Africa's role in the Roman imperial trading network, and words from Latin or other languages of the empire replaced local terms or were introduced locally through cross-border exchange.

Notable writers of Latin from Africa during the Imperial period include the novelist Apuleius, and the Church Fathers Tertullian and Augustine. Latin-speaking communities remained in North Africa, particularly around Carthage, during the period of the Vandal Kingdom (435–534), but died out by the late 7th century, with the Arab conquest.

=== Egypt ===
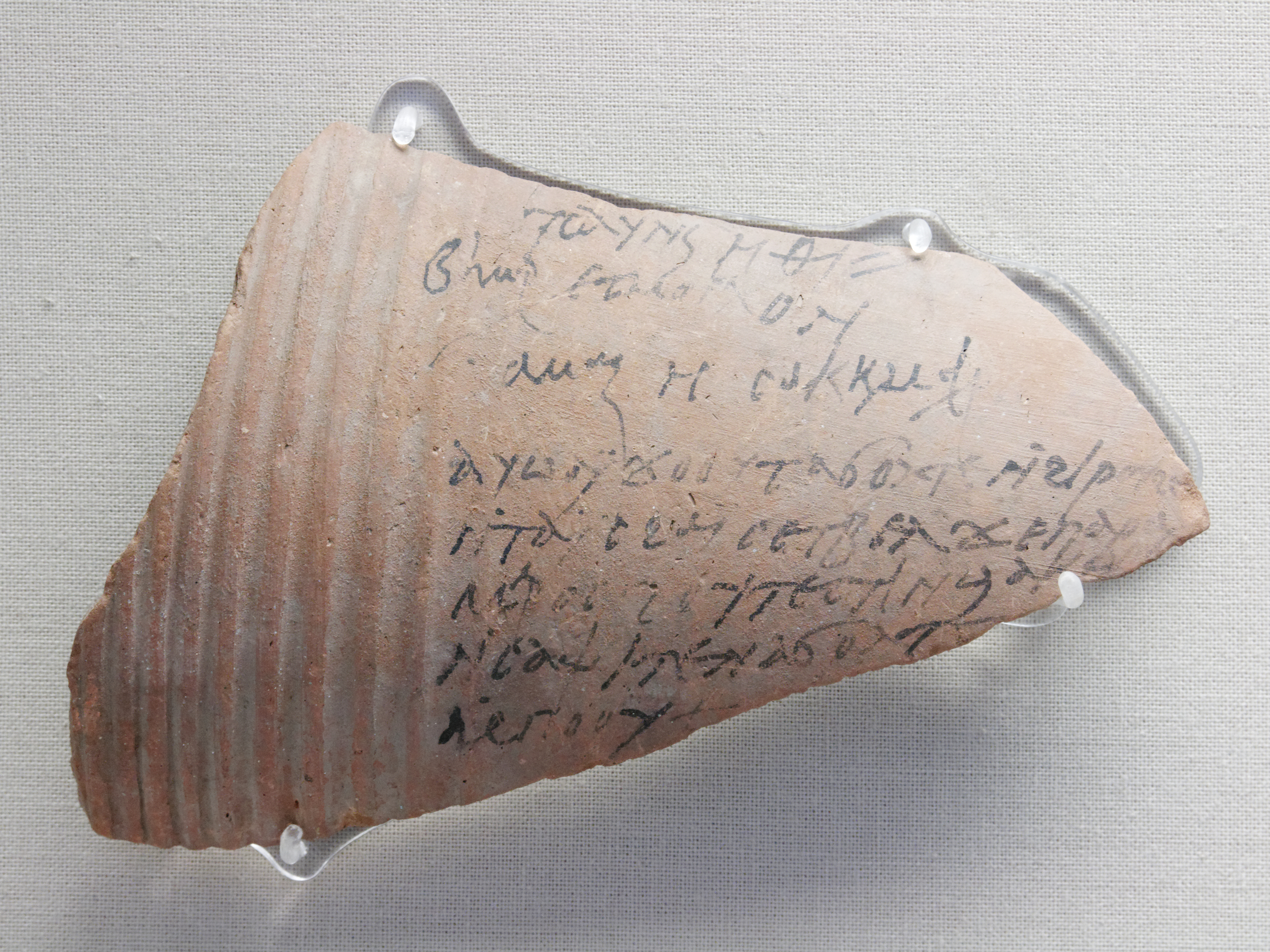
Fragment from a storage vessel recording in Coptic the transport of wheat to a mill, dated June 2, 321 AD

In Egypt, Coptic predominated, but Greek had been in use since the conquest of Alexander, and Latin and Greek were the administrative languages during the Roman Imperial period. Alexandria, founded in 331 BC under Greek rule and one of the three largest cities of the Roman Empire, was a leading city in Greek intellectual life during the Hellenistic and Imperial periods. Famed for the Library of Alexandria, it was also a center for the dissemination of Christianity, which spread first among Greek speakers in Egypt.

Around 700 AD, Greek was replaced for administrative use by Arabic after the Arab conquest of Egypt. Coptic began to decline, and from this point, was preserved mainly for liturgical purposes.

=== Eastern empire ===
Although Greek was in common use around the Mediterranean and into Asia Minor even beyond Imperial borders, linguistic distribution in the eastern part of the Empire was complex. Now-extinct languages in Anatolia included Galatian (the form of Celtic introduced by invading Gauls in the 3rd century BC), Phrygian, Pisidian, and Cappadocian, attested by Imperial-era inscriptions. Christian sources also mention the survival of Galatian, Cappadocian, Mysian, and Isaurian in Asia Minor. Like Greek and Latin, these are sometimes categorized as Indo-European. Phrygian is not named as a language in a literary text until the 6th century, but is preserved in about a hundred funerary inscriptions in Greek script, most accompanied by Greek text as well and dating from the 3rd century. A Cappadocian accent in speaking Greek seems to be mentioned in a few sources.

Outside the military, Latin never became the language of everyday life in the East. An exception was the Roman colony of Berytus (present-day Beirut), where a Latin education could be obtained, and which became famous for its school of Roman law.

=== Danubian provinces and the Balkans ===
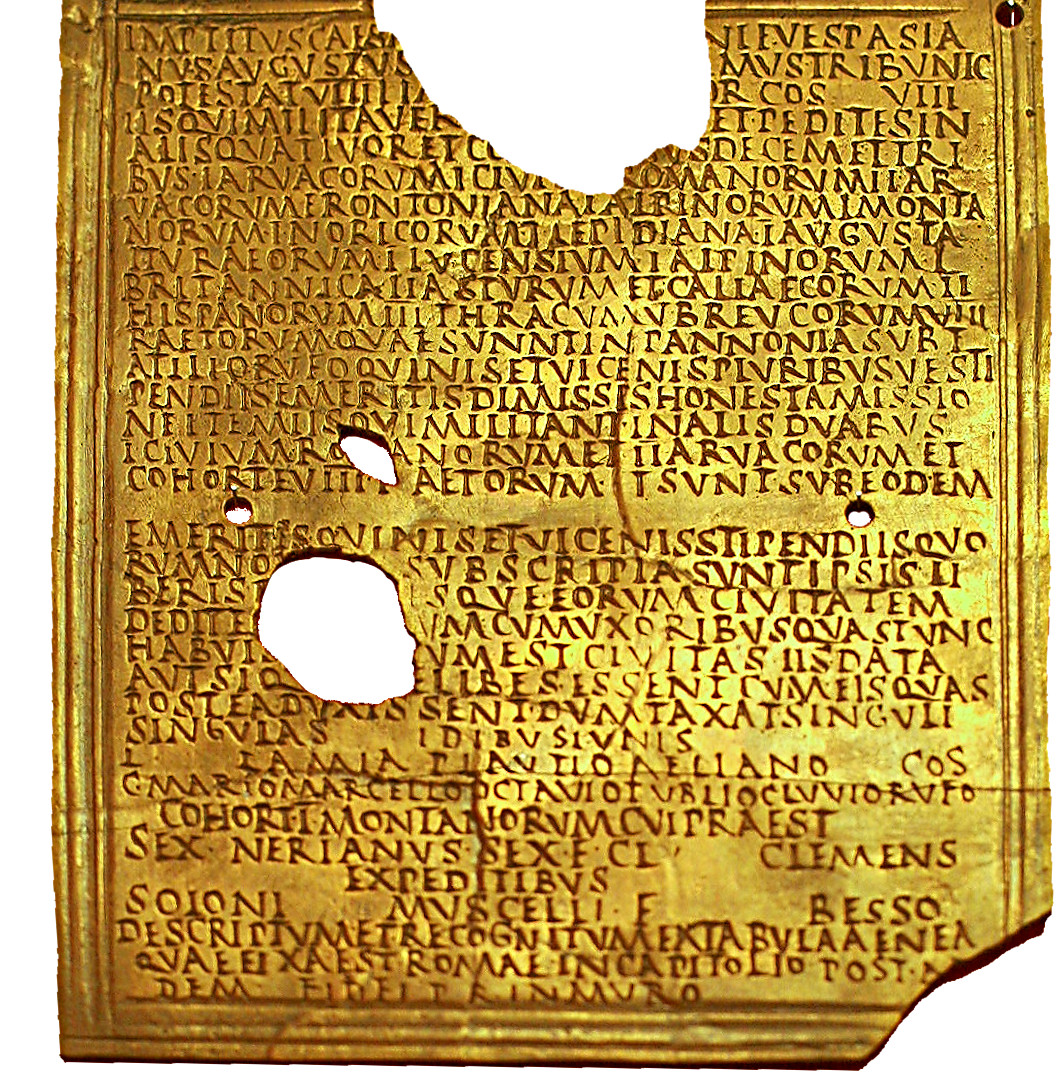
Roman military diploma in Latin dated June 13, 80 AD, from Carnuntum, in the Danubian province of Noricum

The Danubian provinces lay within a geographical area encompassing the middle and lower Danube basins, the Eastern Alps, the Dinarides, and the Balkan Mountains. Provinces in this general region include Noricum, Dacia, Dalmatia, Moesia, Thrace, Scythia, and Pannonia. The Jireček Line is a linguistic boundary that attempts to map the relative distribution of Latin in the north and Greek in the south of the Balkans.

Greek had been in use in the southern part of the Balkans since the late 4th century BC, as a result of the conquests of Philip and Alexander. The ancient Macedonian language, perhaps a Greek dialect, may have been spoken in some parts of what is now Macedonia and northern Greece; to the north of this area, Paeonian would have been used, and to the south Epirot, both scantily attested.

The Palaeo-Balkan languages included Illyrian, which was spoken in the northwest, and to the northeast Thracian and Dacian. From his exile in Tomis on the Black Sea (present-day Constanța, Romania), the Augustan poet Ovid learned Getic (Dacian) and Sarmatian, and noted that Greek was spoken with a markedly Getic accent. Inscriptions from Tomis in the Imperial period are generally Greek, with Thracian personal names and religious references.

Of the ancient Balkan languages aside from Greek, only the precursor of Albanian survived in the western Balkans. Proto-Albanian first came into contact with Latin during the Illyro–Roman wars in the late 3rd and early 2nd centuries BC, but the major Latin influence on Proto-Albanian occurred following the Illyrian Revolt of 6–9 AD, when the western Balkans were incorporated into the Roman Empire. Proto-Albanian speakers were Christianized within the Latin sphere of influence in the 4th century AD.

=== Jewish diaspora ===
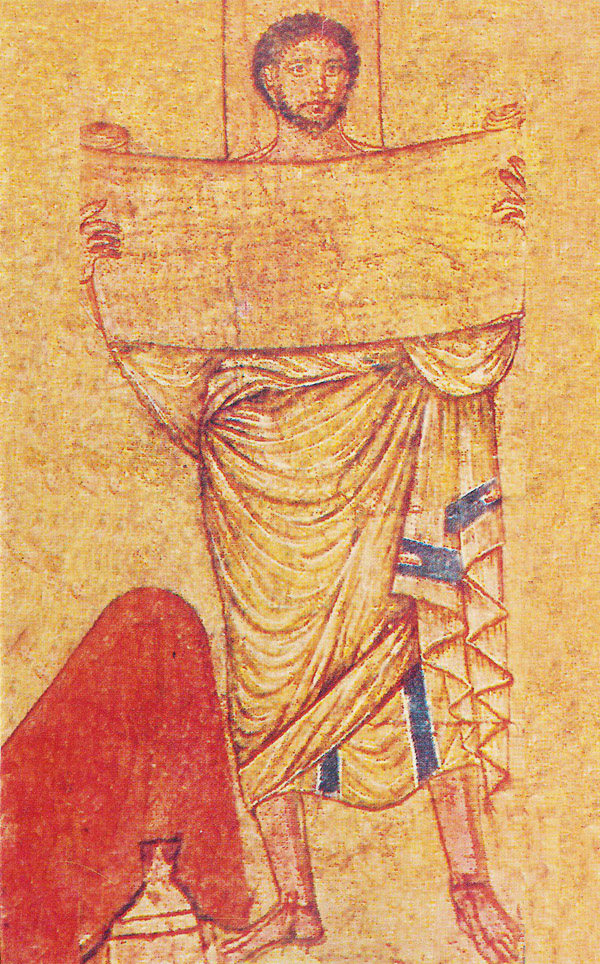
Ezra or Jeremiah reading from a scroll, in a painting from the Dura-Europos synagogue (3rd century)

Inscriptions in Greek and Latin set up by Jews attest to Jewish bi- or multilingualism, and their distribution in the Empire reflects the Jewish diaspora. These may have the Hebrew tag shalom at the end. Evidence for Jews in Egypt is preserved by papyri until the Jewish revolt of 116–117. In the first half of the 5th century, Greek coexisted with Hebrew and Jewish Aramaic in the Jewish communities of Palaestina Prima and Secunda, and is found in mosaic inscriptions even in synagogues.

Like the Septuagint, the Greek translation of the Hebrew Bible that predated the Imperial era, Jewish literature in Greek under the Empire was written mainly for Jews who spoke Greek. Some Jews writing in Greek during the late Hellenistic and early Imperial period—notably the philosopher Philo and the historian Josephus—included gentiles among their intended audience. The Sibylline Oracles and the Wisdom of Solomon are other examples of Jewish literature in Greek from this period.

No surviving Greek texts written after the year 100 AD can be securely identified as having a Jewish author. After this time, Jewish writings in Greek became irrelevant to Christians, who were thus unlikely to preserve them. The manuscription tradition of medieval Jewish culture has preserved only writings in Hebrew and Aramaic.

=== Christian communities ===
The Epistle to Diognetus states that language was not a determining factor in Christian identity; Christians might speak any language. By late antiquity, at least some Christian literature had been created for virtually every language in regular use throughout the Empire.

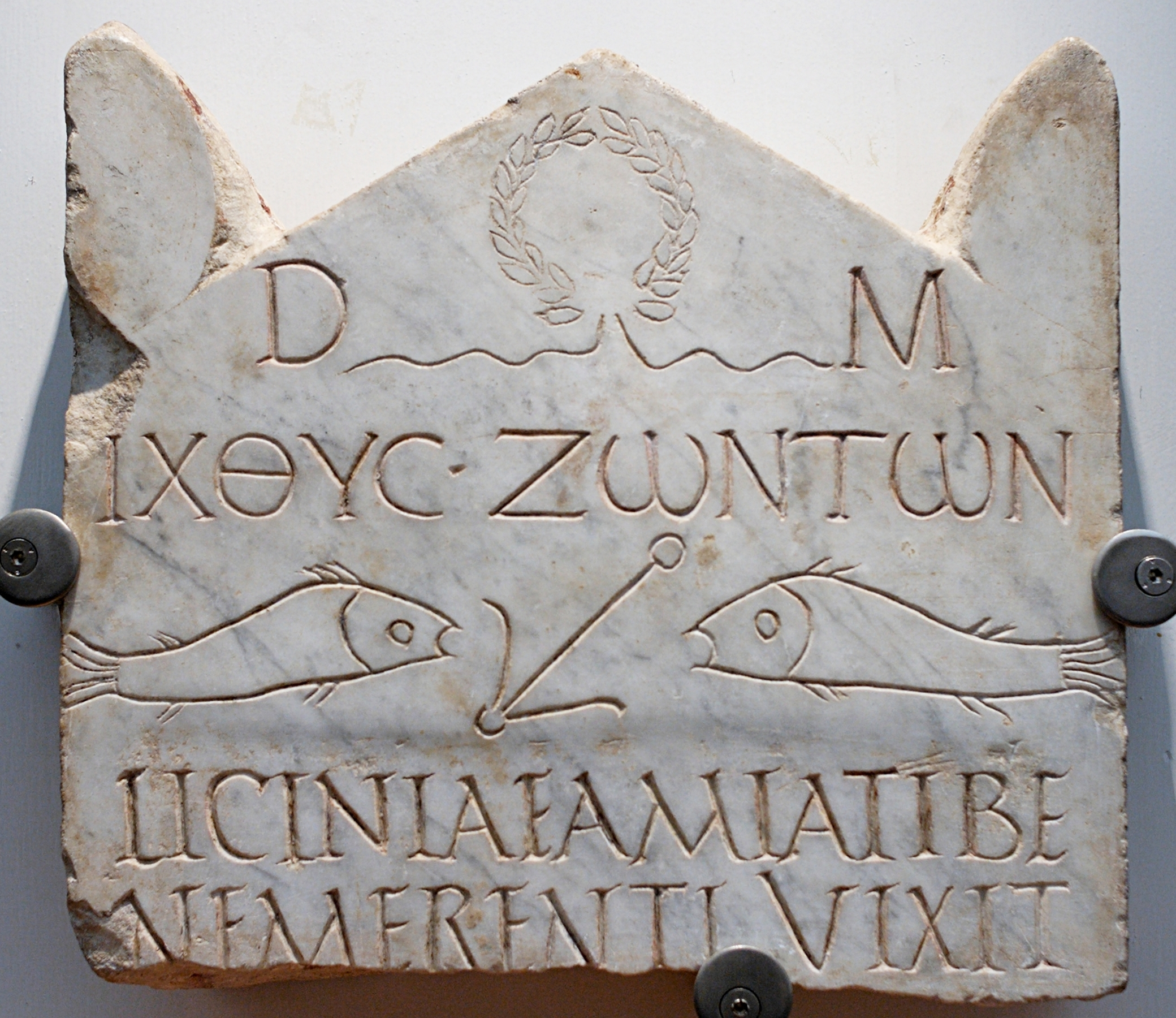
This funerary stele (3rd century) is among the earliest Christian inscriptions: the abbreviation D.M. at the top refers to the Di Manes, the old Roman spirits of the dead, but accompanies Christian anchor and fish symbolism expressed by the Greek phrase "Fish of the Living", followed by the deceased's epitaph in Latin

The international use of Greek was one factor enabling the spread of Christianity, as indicated for example by the use of Greek for the Epistles of Paul. Constantine, the first emperor to actively support Christianity, presumably knew some Greek, but Latin was spoken in his court, and he used an interpreter to address Greek-speaking bishops at the Council of Nicaea. In the Christian Latin West, Greek became associated with "paganism" and regarded as a foreign language (lingua peregrina). Saint Augustine confessed that he loathed Greek and found it hard to learn. By late antiquity, however, it was possible to speak Greek as a primary language while not conceiving of oneself as a "Hellene" in matters of religion and culture. In the first half of the 5th century, Greek was the standard language in which bishops communicated, and the Acta Conciliorum ("Acts of the Church Councils") were recorded originally in Greek and then translated into Latin, Syriac, or Coptic.

During this period, Latin played only a subordinate role in the ecumenical councils, as did representatives from the Western empire. Although traditionally Armenian is regarded as having been established as a Christian language by this time, it does not appear in the Acta. There are hints that Coptic might be spoken at the councils, but no secure record. On-the-spot translation into Greek was available for the participant who used his own language, including some who are referred to as "Arabs", "Saracens" or "Ishmaelites". Christian content has been found in a few Arabic inscriptions from the 6th century.

A silver amulet from what is today Frankurt, in Roman Germany, dating no later than the mid-3rd century, begins with an allusion to the Greek Trisagion in Latin transcription and quotes Philippians 2:10–11 in Latin. Protective amulets to guide a deceased person into the afterlife are common in Classical culture, but this amulet's Christian use makes it extremely rare evidence of early Christianity in Germany.

== Ritual language ==
The form of private or personalized ritual characterized as "magic" might be conducted in a hodgepodge of languages. Magic, and even some therapies for illnesses, almost always involved incantation or the reciting of spells (carmina), often accompanied by the ritualized creation of inscribed tablets (lamellae) or amulets. These are known from both archaeological artifacts and written texts such as the Greek Magical Papyri, a collection of spells dating variously from the 2nd century BC to the 5th century AD. Although Augustus attempted to suppress magic by burning some 2,000 esoteric books early in his reign, magical practices were disseminated widely throughout the Greco-Roman world, and attest to an awareness of multilingualism among the peoples of the Empire. Spells were not translated, because their efficacy was thought to reside in their precise wording; a language such as Gaulish thus may have persisted for private ritual purposes when it no longer had everyday currency.

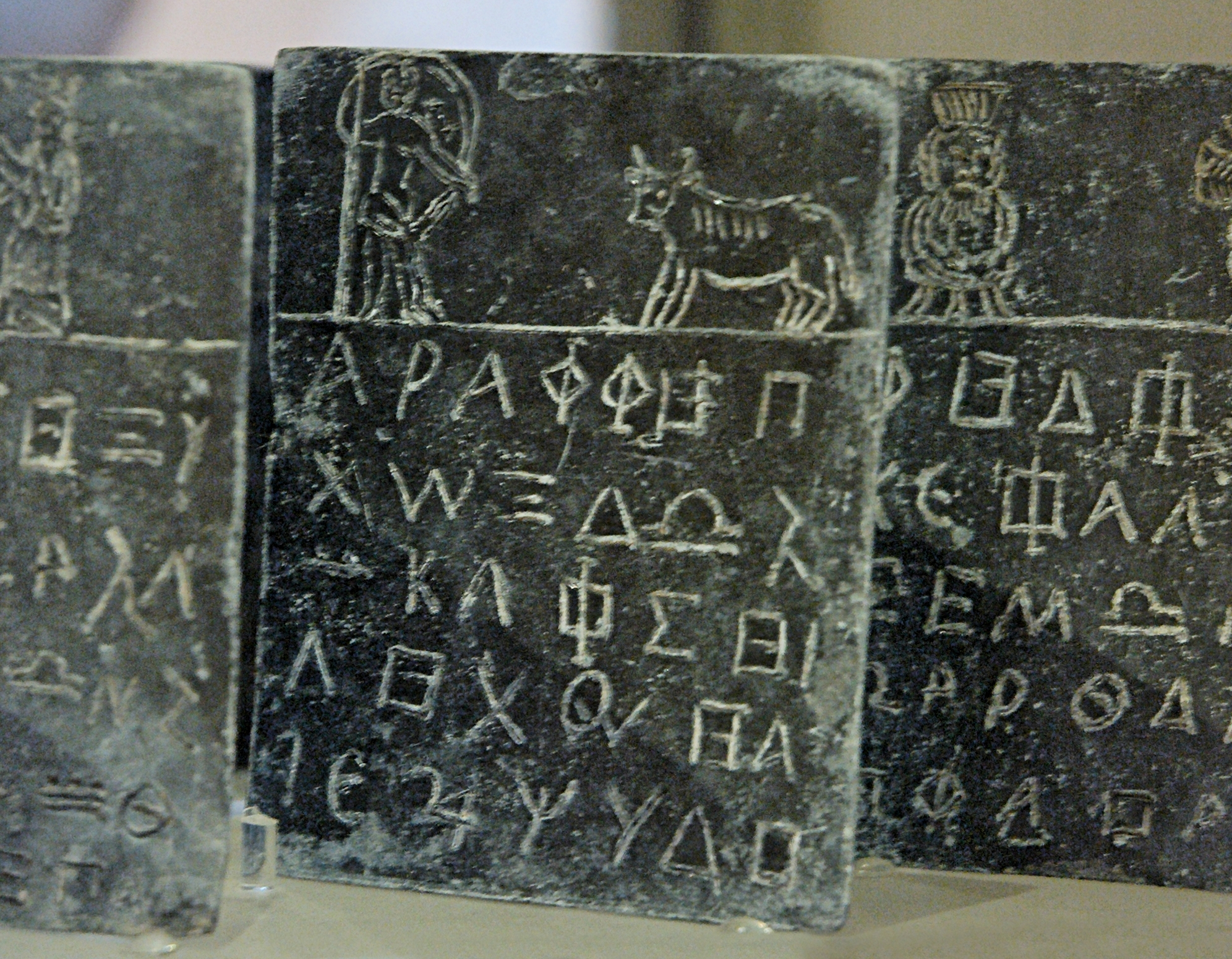
Bound lead tablets of magic inscriptions (300–500 AD)

The Greek Magical Papyri (PGM) reflect Greco-Egyptian syncretism, incorporating not only Egyptian and Hellenistic religion, but Near Eastern elements, including Jewish magic and dashes of Christian magic. Egyptian and Greek deities, the God of the Jews and Judaic angels, and Jesus are named. The PGM are written primarily in Greek with substantial passages in Demotic Egyptian and inserted strings of syllables that are "pronounceable, though unintelligible". These voces magicae ("magic words") occur throughout magic texts and inscriptions, and often suggest corrupt Coptic or Egyptian, Hebrew, Aramaic or other Semitic languages, and Celtic. Hebrew and Greek appear in Demotic magical texts; Coptic magic incorporates Hebrew; Egyptian pops up in Latin spells. While many voces magicae may be deliberate neologisms or obscurantism, scholars have theorized that the more recognizable passages may be the products of garbled or misunderstood transmission, either in copying a source text or transcribing oral material.

Inscriptions for the practice of magic in Gaul show the characteristic use of Greek for spells in the Imperial period. A 2nd-century curse tablet from Autun (Augustodunum) lists the names of those to be cursed in Latin, two magic words in Greek, and a series of voces magicae. A defixio (binding spell) from Amélie-les-Bains seems composed in Celtic with bits of Latin. A lamella from Roman Britain has been interpreted as Hebrew written in Greek characters.

Christians in late antiquity might insert Hebrew into Greek exorcisms. Saint Jerome reports an odd story about a Frankish-Latin bilingual man of the Candidati Imperial bodyguard who, in a state of demonic possession, began speaking perfect Aramaic, a language he did not know.

== Legal language ==
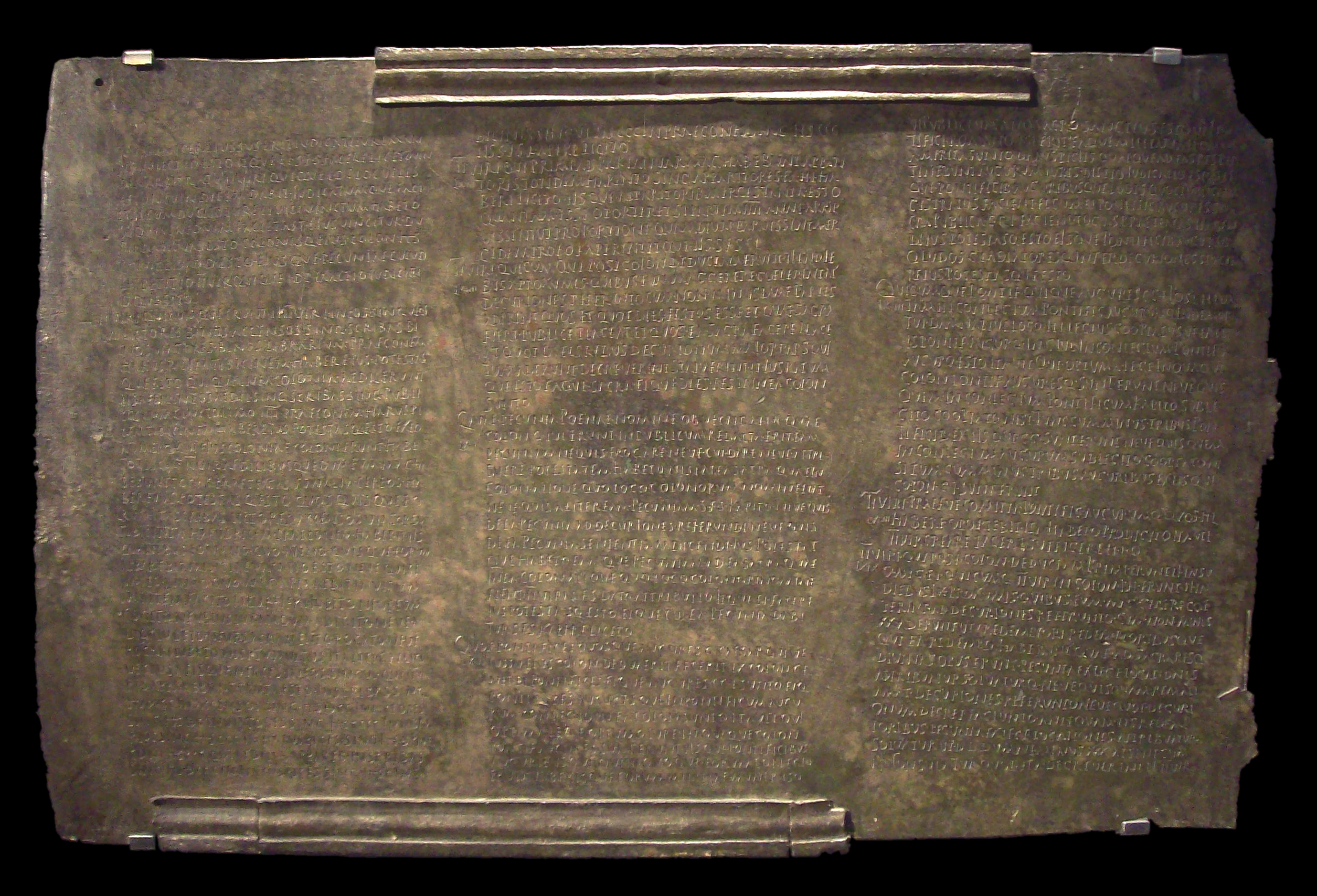
Lex Ursonensis, a colonial charter republished in a Flavian inscription

Roman law was written in Latin, and the "letter of the law" was tied strictly to the words in which it was expressed. Any language, however, could be binding in more general verbal contracts and procedures grounded in the ius gentium or international law. The ius gentium was not a written legal code, but was thought to exist among all peoples as a matter of natural law. Roman jurists show a concern for local languages such as Punic, Gaulish, and Aramaic in assuring the correct understanding and application of laws and oaths.

While the birth certificates and wills of Roman citizens had to be written in Latin until the 220s, in the legal opinion of Ulpian (ca. 215), fideicommissa (bequests in trust) were not limited to Latin or even Greek, but could also be created in "Punic, Gaulish or any other" language. Originally, a testator's fideicommissum placed the heir under a moral rather than legal obligation, and Ulpian asserted that "any kind of speech contains the obligation of its words, provided that each party understands the other's language himself or through accurate interpreters". The jurist Gaius distinguished between verbal contracts that derived their validity from formulaic utterance in Latin, and obligations expressing a mutual understanding of the ius gentium regardless of whether the parties were Roman or not.

== Linguistic legacy ==
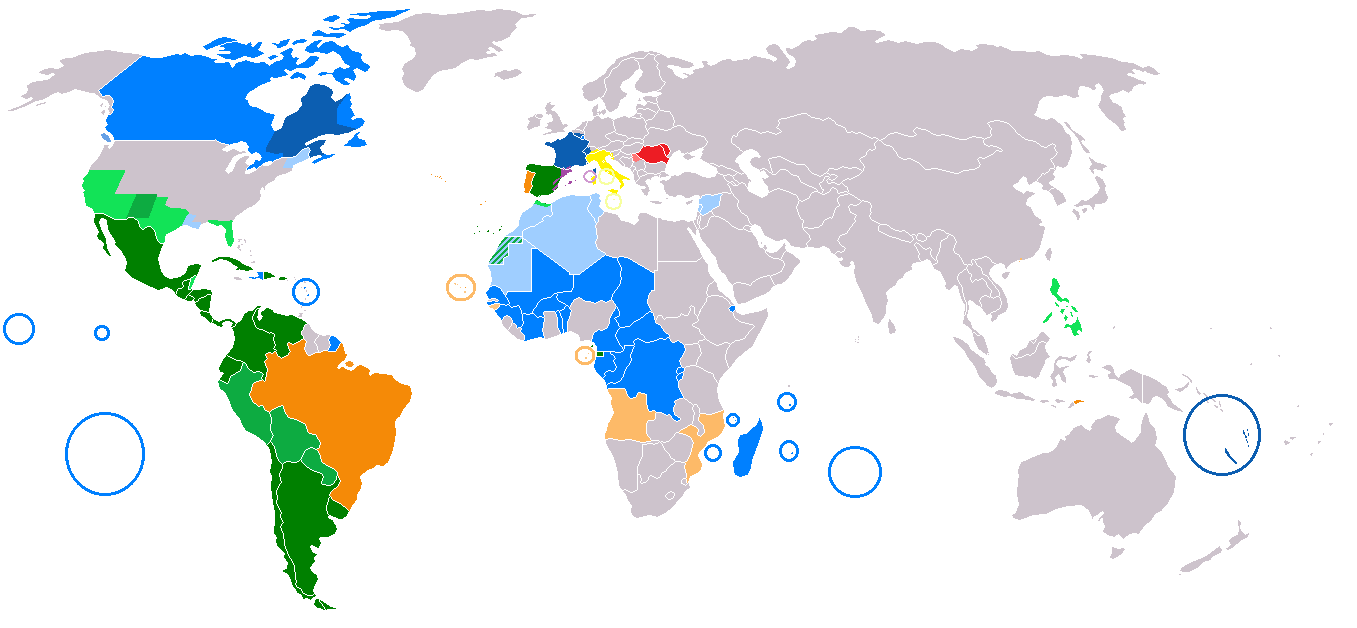
Global distribution of Romance languages in the 21st century (official status in dark areas; widely spoken in lighter areas): French Spanish Portuguese Italian Romanian Catalan

As an international language of learning and literature, Latin continued as an active medium of expression for diplomacy and for intellectual developments identified with Renaissance humanism up to the 17th century, and for law and the Roman Catholic Church to the present.

Greek continued as the language of the Byzantine Empire, but never replaced certain languages with which it had long coexisted, such as Coptic in Egypt, and Aramaic in Syria and Mesopotamia.

After the decentralization of political power in late antiquity, Latin developed locally into branches that became the Romance languages, including Spanish, Portuguese, French, Italian, Romanian, Catalan, Sardinian, Aromanian, African Romance, Mozarabic, Dalmatian, and Venetian, among others.

== Bibliography ==
- Dickey, Eleanor (2023). Latin Loanwords in Ancient Greek: A Lexicon and Analysis (1st ed.). Cambridge and New York: Cambridge University Press. doi:10.1017/9781108888387. ISBN 978-1-108-88838-7. S2CID 258920619. Archived from the original on 9 February 2024.
- Goldhill, Simon (2024-01-31). "Latin Literature and Greek". In Gibson, Roy; Whitton, Christopher (eds.). The Cambridge Critical Guide to Latin Literature. Cambridge and New York: Cambridge University Press. pp. 847–906. ISBN 978-1-108-36330-3.
- Hyllested, Adam; Joseph, Brian D. (2022). "Albanian". The Indo-European Language Family. Cambridge University Press. ISBN 9781108499798.
- Millar, Fergus (2006). A Greek Roman Empire: Power and Belief under Theodosius II (408–450). Berkeley and Los Angeles: University of California Press. ISBN 978-0-520-24703-1.
- Rochette, Bruno (2011). "Language Policies in the Roman Republic and Empire". In Clackson, James (ed.). A Companion to the Latin Language. London: John Wiley & Sons. pp. 549–563. doi:10.1002/9781444343397.ch30. hdl:2268/35932. ISBN 9781405186056. Archived from the original on 9 February 2024.
- ——— (2018). "Was There a Roman Linguistic Imperialism During the Republic and the Early Principate?". Lingue e Linguaggio (1/2018): 107–128. doi:10.1418/90426. ISSN 1720-9331. Archived from the original on 4 October 2023.
- ——— (2023). "The Attitude of the Roman Emperors towards Language Practices". In Mullen, Alex (ed.). Social Factors in the Latinization of the Roman West (1st ed.). Oxford and New York: Oxford University Press. ISBN 978-0-19-888729-4.
- Treadgold, Warren T. (1997). A History of the Byzantine State and Society. Redwood City: Stanford University Press. ISBN 978-0-8047-7937-1.
- McDonnell, Myles Anthony (2006). Roman Manliness: Virtus and the Roman Republic. Cambridge: Cambridge University Press. ISBN 978-0-521-82788-1.
- Oikonomides, Nikos (1999). "L᾽"Unilinguisme" Officiel de Constantinople Byzantine" [The Official Monolingualism of Byzantine Constantinople]. Byzantina Symmeikta (in French). 13: 9–22. doi:10.12681/byzsym.857. ISSN 1105-1639.
- Wallace-Hadrill, Andrew (1998). "To Be Roman, Go Greek Thoughts on Hellenization at Rome". Bulletin of the Institute of Classical Studies. Supplement (71): 79–91. ISSN 2398-3264. JSTOR 43767621. Archived from the original on 28 December 2023.

=== Books ===
==== Monographs ====
- Adams, J.N. Bilingualism and the Latin Language. Cambridge University Press, 2003.
- Anderson, Graham The Second Sophistic: A Cultural Phenomenon in the Roman Empire. Routledge, 1993.
- Ando, Clifford. Imperial Ideology and Provincial Loyalty in the Roman Empire. University of California Press, 2000.
- Clackson, James; Horrocks, Geoffrey. The Blackwell History of the Latin Language. Blackwell, 2007, 2011.
- Goodman, Martin Welsh. Mission and Conversion: Proselytizing in the Religious History of the Roman Empire. Oxford University Press, 1994.
- Herman, József. Vulgar Latin. Translated by Roger Wright, based on the original 1975 publication in French. Pennsylvania State University Press, 2000.
- Millar, Fergus. A Greek Roman Empire: Power and Belief under Theodosius II (408–450). University of California Press, 2006.
- Mullen, Alex. Southern Gaul and the Mediterranean: Multilingualism and Multiple Identities in the Iron Age and Roman Periods. Cambridge University Press, 2013.
- Mullen, A. (ed.) 2023. Social Factors in the Latinization of the Roman West. Oxford: Oxford University Press. https://academic.oup.com/book/55330
- Mullen, A. and Willi, A. (eds) 2024. Latinization, Local Languages, and Literacies in the Roman West. Oxford: Oxford University Press. https://academic.oup.com/book/58982/
- Treadgold, Warren. A History of the Byzantine State and Society. Stanford University Press, 1997.

==== By multiple contributors ====
- Apologetics in the Roman Empire: Pagans, Jews, and Christians. Edited by Mark Edwards, Martin Goodman, and Simon Price, with Christopher Rowland. Oxford University Press, 1999.
- A Companion to the Latin Language. Edited by James Clackson. Blackwell, 2011.
- Multilingualism in the Graeco-Roman Worlds. Edited by Alex Mullen. Cambridge University Press, 2012.
- The Oxford Handbook of the Literatures of the Roman Empire. Edited by Daniel L. Selden and Phiroze Vasunia. Oxford University Press (most of the chapters are available online here).

=== Articles ===
- Adams, J.N. "Romanitas and the Latin Language." Classical Quarterly 53.1 (2003) 184–205. JSTOR 3556490
- MacMullen, Ramsey. "Provincial Languages in the Roman Empire." American Journal of Philology 87.1 (1966) 1–17. JSTOR 292973
- Millar, Fergus. "Local Cultures in the Roman Empire: Libyan, Punic and Latin in Roman Africa." Journal of Roman Studies 58 (1968) 126–134. JSTOR 299702
- Moatti, Claudia. "Translation, Migration, and Communication in the Roman Empire: Three Aspects of Movement in History." Classical Antiquity 25.1 (2006) 109–140. JSTOR 10.1525/ca.2006.25.1.109
- Rance, Philip. "The De Militari Scientia or Müller Fragment as a Philological Resource. Latin in the East Roman Army and Two New Loanwords in Greek: palmarium and *recala." Glotta 86 (2010) 63–92. JSTOR 41219881
