= Alex Mullen (academic) =

Sociolinguist and Roman archaeologist

Alex Mullen FSA FRHistS
- Born: 14 October 1982 (age 43)
- Awards: James Henry Breasted Prize (2014); Philip Leverhulme Prize (2018)

Academic background
- Education: University of Cambridge

Academic work
- Discipline: Classicist; Ancient Historian; Linguist; Archaeologist
- Sub-discipline: Epigraphy; Sociolinguistics; Roman archaeology
- Institutions: University of Nottingham

Alex Mullen FSA FRHistS (born 14 October 1982) is an ancient historian, sociolinguist and Roman archaeologist. She is currently Professor of Ancient History and Sociolinguistics at the University of Nottingham and a fellow of All Souls College, Oxford.

== Early life and education ==
Mullen studied for an undergraduate degree at Jesus College, Cambridge. She completed an M. Phil and PhD, funded by the Arts and Humanities Research Council, also at the University of Cambridge.

== Career ==
From 2008 to 2011 Mullen was a Lumley Research Fellow, at Magdalene College, Cambridge. She was a post-doctoral research fellow at All Souls College, Oxford, from 2011 to 2015. In 2017 she was awarded a European Research Council starting grant for the project 'LatinNow', The Latinization of the North-Western Roman Provinces: Sociolinguistics, Epigraphy and Archaeology. She has published widely on issues of sociolinguistics, bilingualism, and social identity in the Iron Age and Roman worlds, utilising texts, epigraphy and archaeology. In 2017 she was elected as a Fifty-Pound Fellow at All Souls College.

== Awards and honours ==
Mullen's 2013 monograph, Southern Gaul and the Mediterranean: multilingualism and multiple identities in the Iron Age and Roman periods, received the James Henry Breasted Prize in 2014 from the American Historical Association. In 2018, Mullen was awarded a Philip Leverhulme Prize for Classics. Mullen was elected as a fellow of the Society of Antiquaries of London on 26 June 2021, and a fellow of the Royal Historical Society in 2021.

== Selected publications ==
=== Books ===
- Mullen, A and James, P (eds) 2012. Multilingualism in the Graeco-Roman Worlds. Cambridge: Cambridge University Press.
- Mullen, A, 2013. Southern Gaul and the Mediterranean: Multilingualism and Multiple Identities in the Iron Age and Roman Periods. Cambridge: Cambridge University Press.
- Mullen, A. and C. Ruiz Darasse 2018. Gaulish. Language, Writing, Epigraphy. University of Zaragoza Press.
- Elder, O. and A. Mullen 2019. The Language of Roman Letters. Cambridge: Cambridge University Press.
- Mullen, A. and A. Bowman 2021. The Manual of Roman Everyday Writing. Volume 1 Scripts and Texts. Nottingham.
- Mullen, A. (ed.) 2023. Social Factors in the Latinization of the Roman West. Oxford: Oxford University Press. https://academic.oup.com/book/55330
- Mullen, A. and Woudhuysen, G. (eds) 2024. Languages and Communities in the Late-Roman and Post-Imperial Western Provinces. Oxford: Oxford University Press. https://academic.oup.com/book/55329
- Mullen, A. and Willi, A. (eds) 2024. Latinization, Local Languages, and Literacies in the Roman West. Oxford: Oxford University Press. https://academic.oup.com/book/58982/

=== Journal articles ===
- Mullen, A. 2021 'Socio-literacy: an interdisciplinary approach to understanding literacy in the Roman North-West' in M. Ramírez and N. Moncunill (eds) Aprender la escritura, olvidar la escritura (Vitoria) 357–380.
- Mullen, A. and Tomlin, R. S. O. 2019 'More from the Romano-British poets? A new metrical inscription from East Farleigh, Kent' Britannia 50, 47–54.
- Wallace, L. and Mullen, A. 2019 'Landscape, Monumentality and Expression of Group Identities in Iron Age and Roman east Kent' Britannia 50, 75–108.
- Mullen, A. 2016 'Sociolinguistics' in Millett, M., Moore, A. and Revell, L. (eds) The Oxford handbook to Roman Britain (Oxford) 573–598.
- Mullen, A. 2013 'The language of the potteries: communication in the production and trade of Gallo-Roman terra sigillata' in Fulford, M. and Durham, E. (eds) Seeing Red: new economic and social perspectives on terra sigillata (London) 97–110.
- Mullen, A. 2007 'Evidence for written Celtic from Roman Britain: a linguistic analysis of Tabellae Sulis 14 and 18' Studia Celtica 41, 29–43.
