= Roman army in Dacia =

Roman castra, roads and walls in Dacia

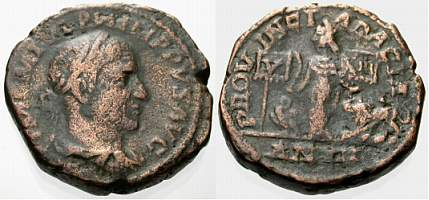
Sestertius minted to celebrate Dacia province and its legions

In Roman Dacia, an estimated 50,000 troops were stationed at its height.

At the close of Trajan’s first campaign in Dacia in 102, he stationed one legion at Sarmizegetusa Regia. With the conclusion of Trajan’s conquest of Dacia, he stationed at least two legions in the new province – the Legio IV Flavia Felix positioned at Berzobis, and the Legio XIII Gemina stationed at Apulum. It has been conjectured that there was a third legion stationed in Dacia at the same time, the Legio I Adiutrix. However, there is no evidence to indicate when or where it was stationed. Debate continues over whether the legion was fully present, or whether it was only the vexillationes who were stationed in the province.

Hadrian, the subsequent emperor, shifted the fourth legion (Legio IV Flavia Felix) from Berzobis to Singidunum in Moesia Superior, suggesting that Hadrian believed the presence of one legion in Dacia would be sufficient to ensure the security of the province. The Marcomannic Wars that erupted north of the Danube forced Marcus Aurelius to reverse this policy, permanently transferring the Legio V Macedonica from Troesmis (modern Iglița in Romania) in Moesia Inferior to Potaissa in Dacia.

Epigraphic evidence attests to large numbers of auxiliary units stationed throughout the Dacian provinces during the Roman period; this has given the impression that Roman Dacia was a strongly militarized province. Yet it seems to have been no more highly militarized than any of the other frontier provinces, like the Moesias, the Pannonias, and Syria, and the number of legions stationed in Moesia and Pannonia were not diminished after the creation of Dacia. However, once Dacia was incorporated into the empire and the frontier was extended northward, the central portion of the Danube frontier between Novae and Durostorum was able to release much-needed troops to bolster Dacia’s defences. Military documents report at least 58 auxiliary units, most transferred into Dacia from the flanking Moesian and Pannonian provinces, with a wide variety of forms and functions, including numeri, cohortes milliariae, quingenariae, and alae. This does not imply that all were positioned in Dacia at the same time, nor that they were in place throughout the existence of Roman Dacia.

== Legions ==
Legio	V E T E R A N A	V I T R I X	F E L I X	P I A F I D E L I S	T O R Q U A T A	A R M I L L A T A	*	Camps
I Adiutrix	-	-	-	✓	-	-	-	Apulum
II Adiutrix	-	-	-	-	-	-	-	?
III Gallica	-	-	-	-	-	-	-	Porolissum
IV Flavia	-	-	✓	-	-	-	-	Bersobis, Sarmizegetusa Ulpia Traiana, Micia
V Macedonica	-	-	-	✓	-	-	-	Potaissa
VI Ferrata	-	-	-	-	-	-	-	?
VII Claudia	-	-	-	-	-	-	-	Romula, Drobeta, Castra of Bumbești-Jiu - Gară, Castra of Bumbești-Jiu - Vârtop
VII Gemina	-	-	-	-	-	-	Tadius	Porolissum
X Gemina	-	-	-	-	-	-	-	Sucidava
XIII Gemina	-	-	-	✓	-	-	-	Apulum, (Slăveni), Caput Stenarum, Arcobara, Dierna, Drobeta, Micia, Porolissum, Praetorium (castra of Mehadia), Stenarum, Ulpia Traiana Sarmizegetusa
XXII Primigenia	-	-	-	-	-	-	Philippianorum	Romula

== Cohorts ==
Cohort	V E T E R A N A	M I L L I A R I A	Q U I N G E N A R I A	P E D I T A T A	S C U T A T A	E Q U I T A T A	S A G I T T A R I A	S P E C U L A T O R U M	C I V I U M R O M A N O R U M	P I A F I D E L I S	T O R Q U A T A	*	Camps
I Afrorum	-	-	-	-	-	✓	-	-	✓	-	-	-	?
I Alpinorum	-	-	✓	-	-	✓	-	-	-	-	-	-	(Călugăreni), (Orheiu Bistriței), (Sărățeni), (Odorheiu Secuiesc)
I Antiochensium	-	-	✓	-	-	✓	-	-	-	-	-	-	Drobeta
I Batavorum	-	✓	-	-	-	✓	-	-	✓	✓	-	-	Certinae
I Bracaraugustanorum	-	-	✓	-	-	✓	-	-	✓	-	-	-	Angustia, (Boroșneu Mare)
I Brittonum	-	✓	-	✓	-	-	-	-	-	-	-	Augusta Nervia Pacensis, Aurelia, Flavia Malvensis	Buridava, (Bumbești-Jiu - Gară), (Bumbești-Jiu - Vârtop), Malva
I Brittonum	-	✓	-	-	-	✓	-	-	✓	✓	✓	Ulpia	Drobeta, Praetorium (of Mehadia), Samum, Arcobara, Certinae, Porolissum, Resculum
I Cananefatium	-	-	✓	✓	-	-	-	-	-	-	-	-	(Tihău)
I Commagenorum	-	-	✓	-	-	✓	✓?	-	-	-	-	Flavia	Acidava, Jidava, Romula, (Sfârleanca), (Slăveni), (Drajna de Sus)
I Cretum	-	-	✓	✓	-	-	✓	-	-	-	-	-	Drobeta
I Cypria	-	-	-	✓	-	-	-	-	✓	-	-	-	(Bumbești-Jiu - Gară), (Bumbești-Jiu - Vârtop)
I Gallorum	-	?	?	✓	-	-	-	-	-	-	-	Dacica	?
I Gaesatorum	-	✓	-	✓	-	-	✓	-	-	-	-	Aelia	Resculum
I Hemesenorum	-	✓	-	✓	-	-	-	-	-	-	-	Aurelia Antonina	Micia
I Hispanorum	-	✓	-	-	-	✓	-	-	✓	-	-	Flavia Ulpia	(Orheiu Bistriței), Napoca
I Hispanorum	-	-	✓	✓	-	-	-	-	-	✓	-	-	Largiana
I Hispanorum	✓	-	✓	-	-	✓	-	-	-	-	-	-	Arutela, (Slăveni), Castra Traiana, Angustia, (Boroșneu Mare), (Reci), (Tirighina-Bărboși)
I Ituraerorum	-	-	✓	✓	-	-	✓	-	-	-	-	Augusta	Porolissum, (Buciumi), Certinae
I Montanorum	-	-	✓	✓	-	-	-	-	✓	-	-	-	?
I Pannioniorum	✓	✓	-	-	-	✓	-	-	-	-	-	-	(Gilău), Arrubium
I Sagittariorum	-	✓	-	-	-	✓	✓	-	-	-	-	-	Drobeta, (Zăvoi), Tibiscum
I Thracum	?	✓	-	?	-	?	?	?	✓	?	?	?	?
I Thracum	-	-	✓	✓	-	-	✓	-	-	✓	-	-	Acidava
I Tyriorum	-	-	✓	✓	-	-	✓	-	-	-	-	-	Agnaviae?, Arutela
I Ubiorum	-	-	✓	✓	-	-	-	-	-	-	-	-	Stenarum, (Călugăreni), (Orheiu Bistriței), (Odorheiu Secuiesc)
I Vindelicorum	-	✓	-	✓	-	-	-	-	-	-	-	Cumidavensis	Arcidava, Cumidava, Tibiscum
II Bessorum	-	-	✓	✓	-	-	-	-	-	-	-	Flavia	Buridava, (Cincșor), (Rucăr), (Olteni)?
II Brittonum	-	✓	-	✓	-	-	-	-	-	-	-	Augusta Nervia Pacensis	(Buciumi)
II Britonnum / Britannica	-	✓	-	-	-	✓	-	-	✓	✓	-	-	Arcobara, Certinae, Samum
II Commagenorum	-	-	✓	-	-	✓	✓	-	-	-	-	Flavia	Micia
II Gallorum	-	-	✓	✓	-	-	-	-	-	-	-	-	?
II Gallorum	-	-	✓	-	-	-	✓	-	-	-	-	Dacica	?
II Gallorum	-	-	✓	✓	-	-	-	-	-	-	-	Macedonica	?
II Gallorum	-	-	✓	✓	-	-	✓	-	-	-	-	Pannonica	?
II Hispanorum	-	-	✓	-	✓	✓	-	-	✓	-	-	Cyrenaica	Drobeta, Resculum
II Numidarum	-	-	-	✓	-	-	-	-	-	-	-	Flavia	(Feldioara)
III Campestris	-	✓	-	✓	-	-	-	-	✓	-	-	-	Napoca, Drobeta, Porolissum
III Commagenorum	-	?	?	?	-	?	-	-	?	-	-	-	?
III Delmatarum	-	✓	-	-	-	✓	-	-	✓	-	-	-	Dierna, (Moldova Veche), Porolissum, Praetorium (Mehadia)
III Gallorum	-	-	✓	-	-	✓	-	-	-	-	✓	Felix	Pons Aluti, (Hoghiz), (Boroșneu Mare)
IV Betasiorum	-	?	?	✓	-	-	-	-	-	-	-	-	(Olteni)
IV Hispanorum	-	-	✓	-	-	✓	-	-	-	-	-	-	Praetoria Augusta
V Gallorum	-	-	✓	-	-	-	✓	-	-	-	-	-	(Pojejana)
V Lingonum	-	-	✓	✓	-	-	-	-	-	-	-	-	Porolissum
VI Gallica	?	?	✓	?	-	?	?	?	?	?	?	?	?
VI Thracum	-	-	✓	-	-	✓	-	-	✓	-	-	-	Certinae, Optatiana, Porolissum
VI Cumidavensium	-	-	✓	✓	-	-	-	-	-	-	-	Alexandrina Nova	Cumidava
VIII Raetorum	-	-	✓	-	-	✓	-	-	✓	-	✓	-	Ad Pannonios, Praetorium (Mehadia), Praetoria Augusta
IX Batavorum	?	✓	-	-	-	✓	?	?	?	?	?	?	Buridava

== Alae ==
Ala	V E T E R A N A	M I L L I A R I A	Q U I N G E N A R I A	S C U T A T A	S A G I T T A R I A	S P E C U L A T O R U M	C I V I U M R O M A N O R U M	P I A F I D E L I S	T O R Q U A T A	A R M I L L A T A	*	Camps
I Asturum	-	-	✓	-	-	-	-	-	-	-	-	(Hoghiz), (Boroșneu Mare)
I Batavorum	-	✓	-	-	-	-	-	-	-	-	-	(Boroșneu Mare), (Războieni-Cetate)
I Bosporanorum	-	?	?	-	-	-	?	-	-	-	-	Cristești / Marcodava?
I Brittonum / Britannica	-	?	?	-	-	-	✓	-	-	-	-	(Gherla)?, Porolissum?
I Flavia	-	-	✓	-	-	-	-	-	-	-	Flavia	Samum, (Boroșneu Mare)
I Gallorum	-	-	✓	-	-	-	-	-	-	-	Claudia Capitoniana, Atectorigiana	(Boroșneu Mare), (Reci), (Slăveni)
I Hispanorum	-	-	✓	-	-	-	-	✓	-	-	-	(Slăveni)
I Hispanorum Campagnorum	-	-	✓	-	-	-	-	-	-	-	-	Micia
I Illicorum	-	-	✓	-	-	-	-	-	-	-	-	(Brâncovenești), (Orheiu Bistriței)
I Palmyrenorum	-	-	✓	-	-	-	-	-	-	-	-	(Boroșneu Mare)
I Siliana	-	-	✓	-	-	-	✓	-	✓	✓	Siliana	(Gilău)
I Tungrorum	-	-	✓	-	-	-	-	-	-	-	Frontoniana	Arcobara
II [Gallorum et] Pannoniorum	✓	-	✓	-	-	-	-	-	-	-	-	(Gherla)

== Numeri ==
Numerus	S I N G U K A R I U M	P E D I T U M	E Q U I T U M	S A G I T T A R I O R U M	E X P L O R A T O R U M	S P E C U L A T O R U M	C I V I U M R O M A N O R U M	*	Camps
Africae et Mauretaniae Caesariensis	-	-	-	-	-	-	-	-	?
Brittannicianorum	✓	✓	-	-	-	-	-	-	Germisara
Burgariorum et Veredariorum	-	-	-	-	-	-	-	-	Praetorium
Campestrorum	-	-	?	-	?	-	?	-	Micia?, Potaissa?
Germanicianorum	-	-	-	-	✓	-	-	-	(Bucium)
Illycorum	-	-	✓	-	-	-	-	-	(Brâncovenești), (Hoghiz)
Maurorum Hispanorum	-	-	-	-	-	-	-	-	Ampelum
Maurorum Miciensium	-	-	-	-	-	-	-	-	Micia
Maurorum O(ptatianensium?)	-	-	-	-	-	-	-	-	Optatiana
Maurorum S(aldensium?)	-	-	-	-	-	-	-	-	(Răcari), Pelendava
Maurorum Tibiscensium	-	-	-	-	-	-	-	-	Tibiscum
Palmyrenorum Porolissensium	-	-	-	✓	-	-	-	-	Porolissum
Palmyrenorum Tibiscensium	-	-	-	✓	-	-	-	-	Tibiscum
Syrorum	-	-	-	✓	-	-	-	-	(Rădăcinești), Arutela, Romula, (Slăveni)

== See also ==
- Roman Dacia
- Imperial Roman army
- List of Roman auxiliary regiments

== Sources ==
- Bury, John Bagnell (1893). A history of the Roman Empire: from its foundation to the death of Marcus Aurelius (27 B.C.–180 A.D.). Student's Series. New York: Harper.
- Katsari, Constantina (2011). The Roman Monetary System: The Eastern Provinces from the First to the Third Century AD. Cambridge: Cambridge University Press. ISBN 978-0-521-76946-4.
- MacKendrick, Paul Lachlan (2000). The Dacian Stones Speak. The University of North Carolina Press. ISBN 978-0-8078-4939-2.
- Oltean, Ioana Adina (2007). Dacia: landscape, colonisation and romanization. Routledge monographs in classical studies. London and New York: Routledge. ISBN 978-0-415-41252-0.
- Parker, Philip (2010). The Empire Stops Here: A Journey Along the Frontiers of the Roman World. New York: Random House. ISBN 978-1-4090-1632-8.
