= Cohors I Brittonum milliaria =

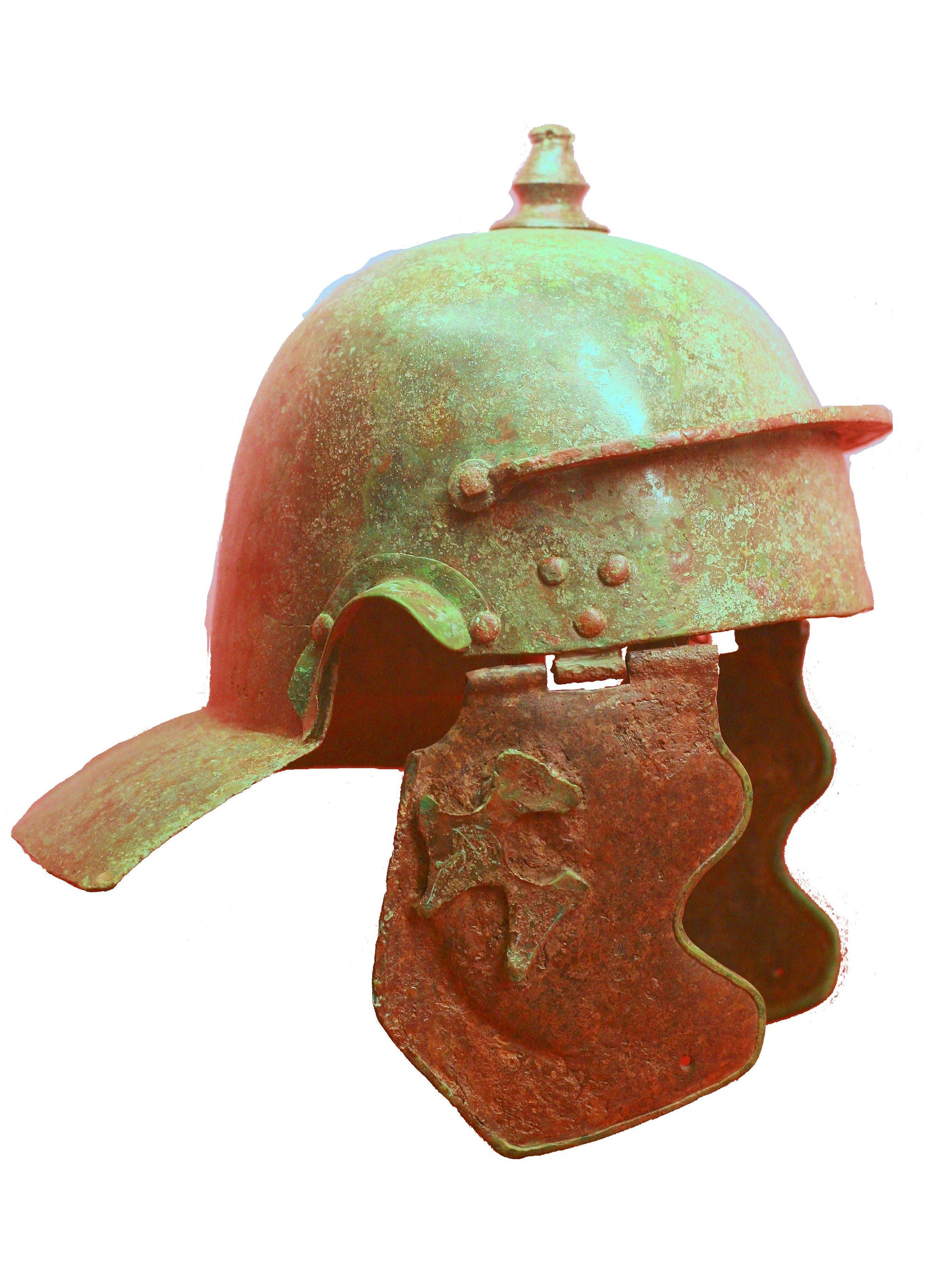
- Roman infantry helmet (late 1st century)
- Active: ?
- Country: Roman Empire
- Type: Roman auxiliary cohort
- Role: infantry
- Size: 1000? men (1000? infantry)

Cohors [prima] "Augusta Nervia Pacensis" / "Aurelia" / "Flavia Malvensis" Brittonum milliaria [peditata] ("[1st infantry 1000 strong] "venerable, Nervian and peaceful" / "Aurelian" / "Flavian" cohort of Brittones") was a Roman auxiliary infantry cohort. It was stationed at forts in Dacia: castra Buridava, Malva, Vârtop, and the successor to the Vârtop camp, Gară. It and Cohors I Britannica are the first cohorts bearing the appellation milliaria referred to in extant records, in the diploma for Pannonia of 85 CE.

== See also ==
- List of Roman auxiliary regiments

== Sources ==
- Academia Română: Istoria Românilor, Vol. 2, Daco-romani, romanici, alogeni, 2nd. Ed., București, 2010, ISBN 978-973-45-0610-1 (in Romanian)
- Constantin C. Petolescu: Dacia - Un mileniu de istorie, Ed. Academiei Române, 2010, ISBN 978-973-27-1999-2 (in Romanian)
- Cristian M. Vlădescu: Fortificațiile romane din Dacia Inferior, Craiova, 1986 (in Romanian)
- Petru Ureche: Tactică, strategie și specific de luptă la cohortele equitate din Dacia Romană (in Romanian)
