= Olteni (disambiguation) =

Olteni is a commune in Teleorman County, Romania.

Olteni may also refer to:

- Olteni Roman fort
- Olteni, a village in Râmeț Commune, Alba County, Romania
- Drăganu-Olteni, a village in Drăganu Commune, Argeș County, Romania
- Olteni, a village in Bodoc Commune, Covasna County, Romania
- Olteni, a village in Lucieni Commune, Dâmboviţa County, Romania
- Olteni, a village in Uliești Commune, Dâmboviţa County, Romania
- Olteni, a village in Clinceni Commune, Ilfov County, Romania
- Olteni, a village in Independenţa Commune, Constanţa County, Romania
- Olteni, a village in Teișani Commune, Prahova County, Romania
- Olteni, a village in Vârteșcoiu Commune, Vrancea County, Romania
- Olteni, a village in Bujoreni Commune, Vâlcea County, Romania

== See also ==
- Oltenia
