= Cohors I Batavorum milliaria c.R. pf =

Ancient Roman military unit

Cohors I Batavorum milliaria civium Romanorum pia fidelis
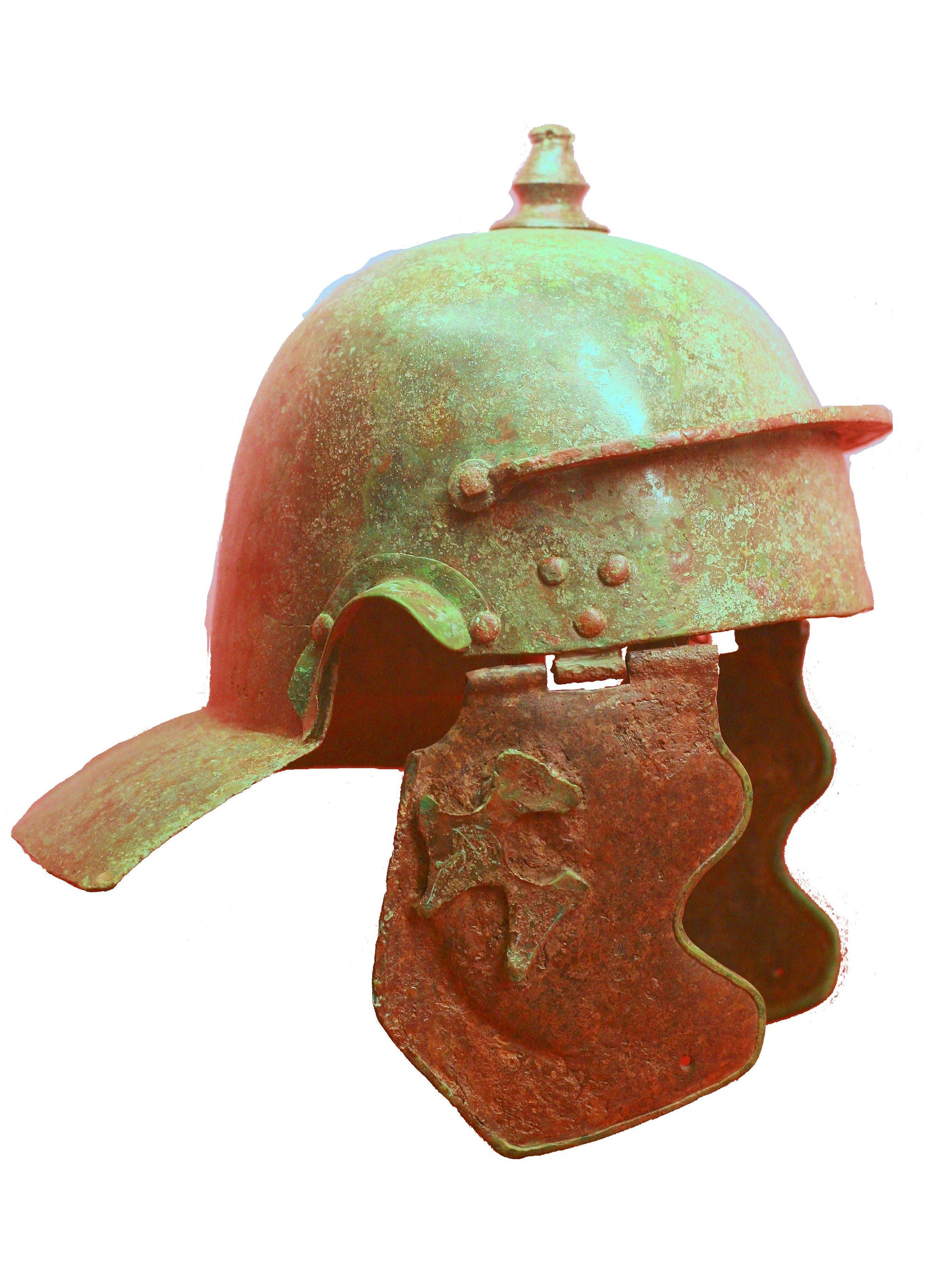
- Roman infantry helmet (late 1st century)
- Active: ?
- Country: Roman Empire
- Type: Roman auxiliary cohort
- Role: infantry
- Size: 800 infantry

Cohors [prima] Batavorum milliaria civium Romanorum pia fidelis ("[1st] 1000 strong cohort of Roman citizens Batavi, dutiful and loyal") was a Roman auxiliary cohort of infantry.

== Military diplomas ==
The unit is attested on several military diplomas for the provinces of Pannonia, Pannonia Superior and Dacia Porolissensis.

=== Pannonia ===
- 98 (CIL XVI, 42)
- 100/102 (RMD-03,144)

=== Pannonia Superior ===
- 112 (RMD-04,223)
- 113 (RMD-02,86)

=== Dacia Porolissensis ===
- 133 (RMD-01,35)
- 164 (CIL XVI, 185)

The unit is attested by two diplomas issued in 165 AD at castra of Gilău and Samum. In another diploma from Gilău, dated 161/162 AD, only the "milliaria" term is preserved.

== Home base ==
The cohort was stationed in Dacia at Certinae. An inscription from Largiana could mention this unit too. After the unit left Dacia, it was probably stationed at Salonika in Macedonia.

== Attested personnel ==
The following personnel is attested on diplomas or inscriptions:

=== Commanders ===
- Αυρηλιος Ουαλεντινος (ca. 267)
- Galeo (Tettienus) Bellicus (ca. 164): he is listed on the military diploma (CIL XVI, 185)
- Tullius Secundus (ca. 113): he is listed on the military diploma (RMD-02,86)

=== Soldiers ===
- Aelius Certus, signifer (CIL III, 13760)
- Aurelius Reatinus Birsi - miles from Potaissa
- C. Campanius Vitalis - centurion from Certiae (CIL III, 839)
- M. Ulpius, pedes: the diploma (RMD-02,86) was issued for him.
- Sextus, pedes: the diploma (CIL XVI, 185) was issued for him.

== See also ==
- List of Roman auxiliary regiments
