= Cohors I Flavia Ulpia Hispanorum miliaria eq c.R. =

Cohors I Flavia Ulpia Hispanorum milliaria equitata civium Romanorum
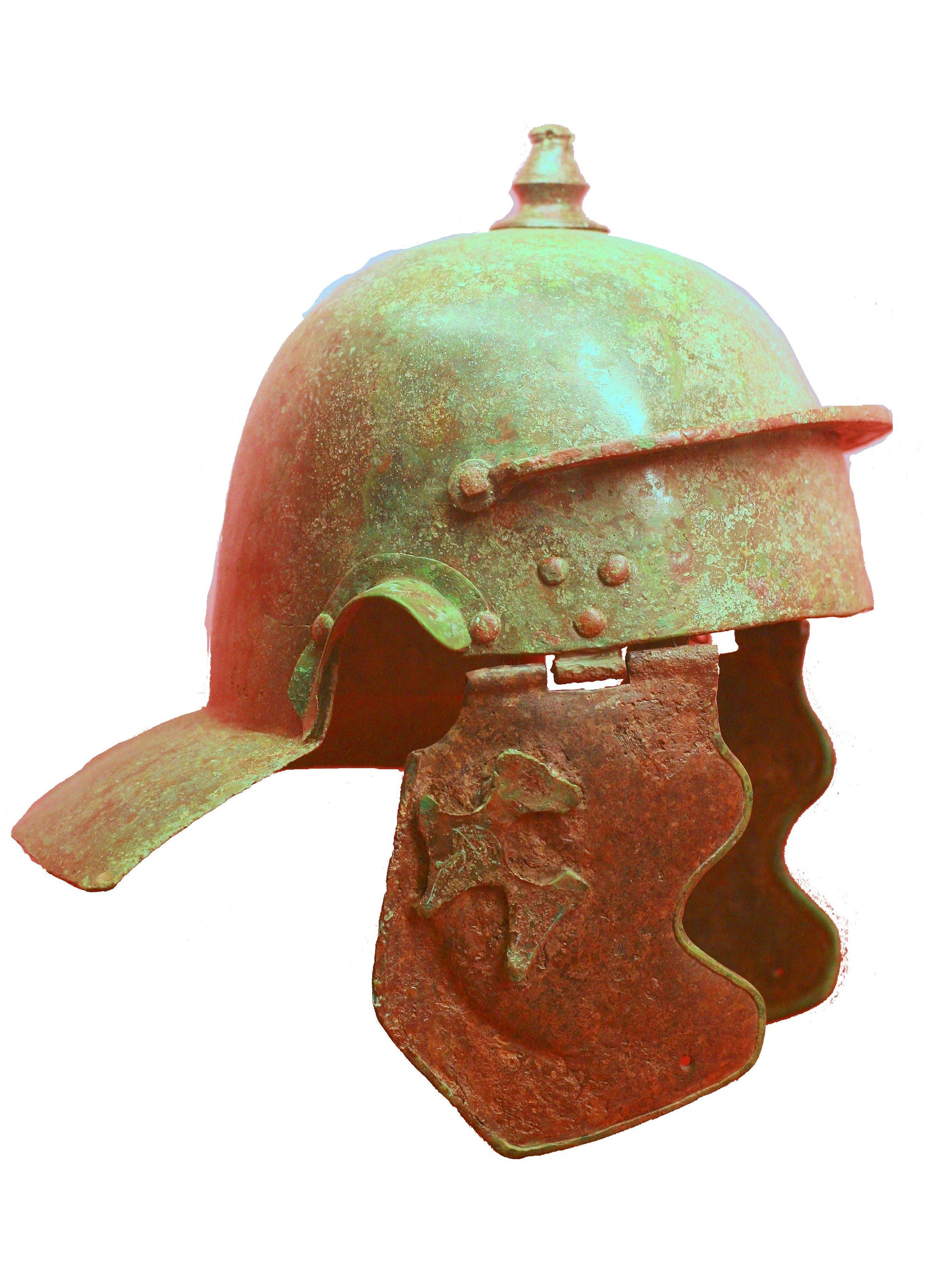
- Roman infantry helmet (late 1st century)
- Active: ?
- Country: Roman Empire
- Type: Roman auxiliary cohort
- Role: infantry/cavalry
- Size: 1,040 men (800 infantry, 240 cavalry)

Cohors [prima] Flavia Ulpia Hispanorum milliaria equitata civium Romanorum ("[1st] part-mounted 1000 strong Flavian and Ulpian cohort of Roman citizens Hispani") was a Roman auxiliary regiment containing cavalry contingents. The cohort stationed in Dacia at castra of Orheiu Bistriței and castra Napoca.

== See also ==
- List of Roman auxiliary regiments
