= Reci (disambiguation) =

Reci is a commune in Covasna County, Romania.

Reci or Reçi may also refer to:

- Castra of Reci, a Roman fort in the province of Dacia
- Reci, a tributary of the Râul Negru in Covasna County, Romania
- Reciu, a tributary of the Gârbova in Alba County, Romania
- Reçi, Albanian tribe

== See also ==
- Sarmalele Reci, a Romanian rock band
