= Samum =

Samum can refer to

- Samum (castrum) - a Roman fort in Dacia
- Russian corvette Samum - a ship of the Russian Navy
- Nar as-samum - a concept in Islam
