= Cohors I Flavia Commagenorum equitata =

Cohors I Flavia Commagenorum quingenaria equitata sagittaria?
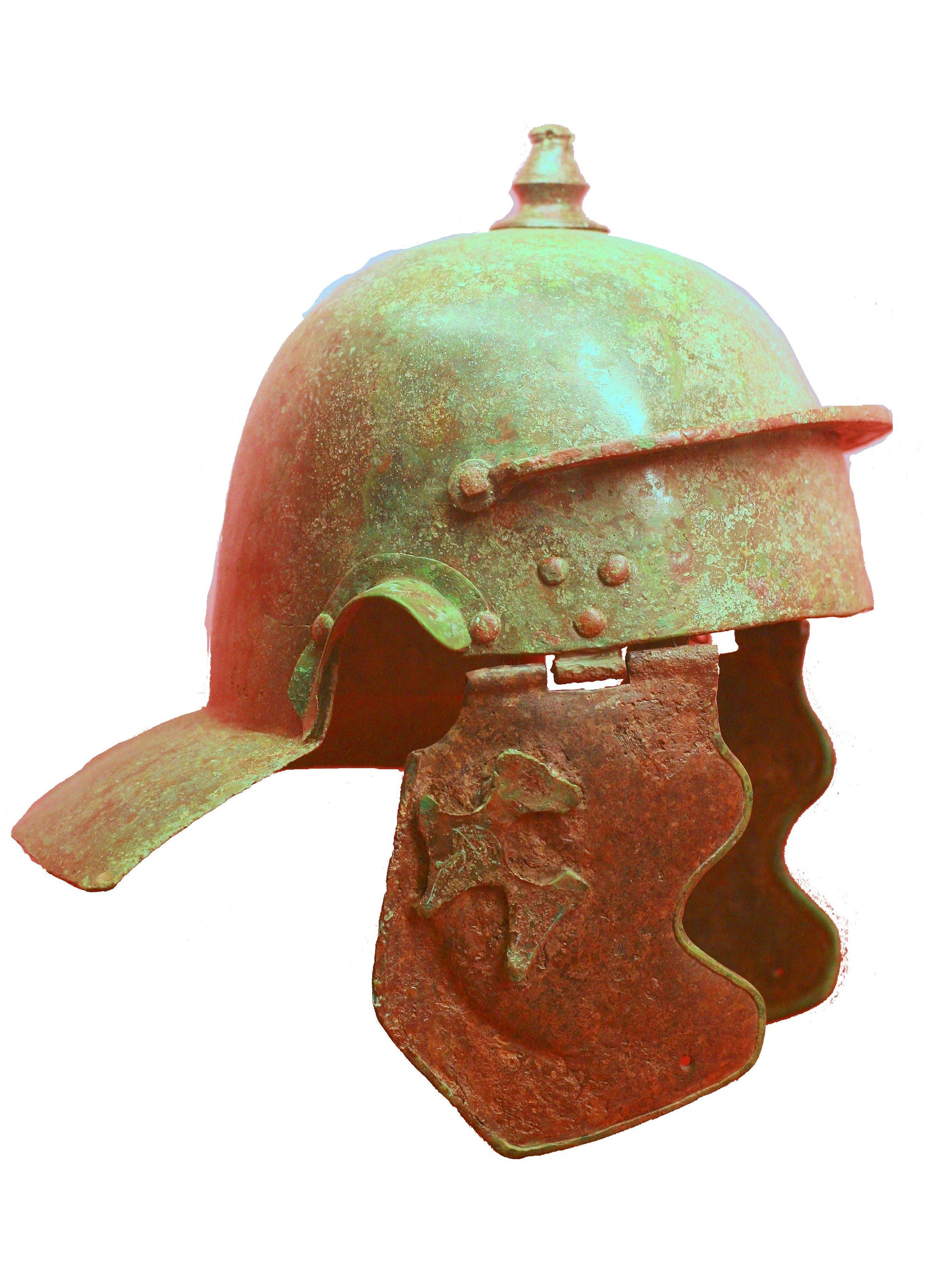
- Roman infantry helmet (late 1st century)
- Active: ?
- Country: Roman Empire
- Type: Roman auxiliary cohort
- Role: infantry/cavalry
- Size: 500 men (380 infantry, 120 cavalry)

Cohors [prima] Flavia Commagenorum [quingenaria] equitata sagittaria? ("[1st] part-mounted [500 strong] cohort of Commagenes") was a Roman auxiliary regiment containing cavalry contingents. The cohort stationed in Dacia at castra Acidava, castra Jidava, castra Romula, castra of Sfârleanca, castra of Slăveni and castra of Drajna de Sus.

== See also ==
- List of Roman auxiliary regiments
