= Cohors III Delmatarum equitata c.R. pf =

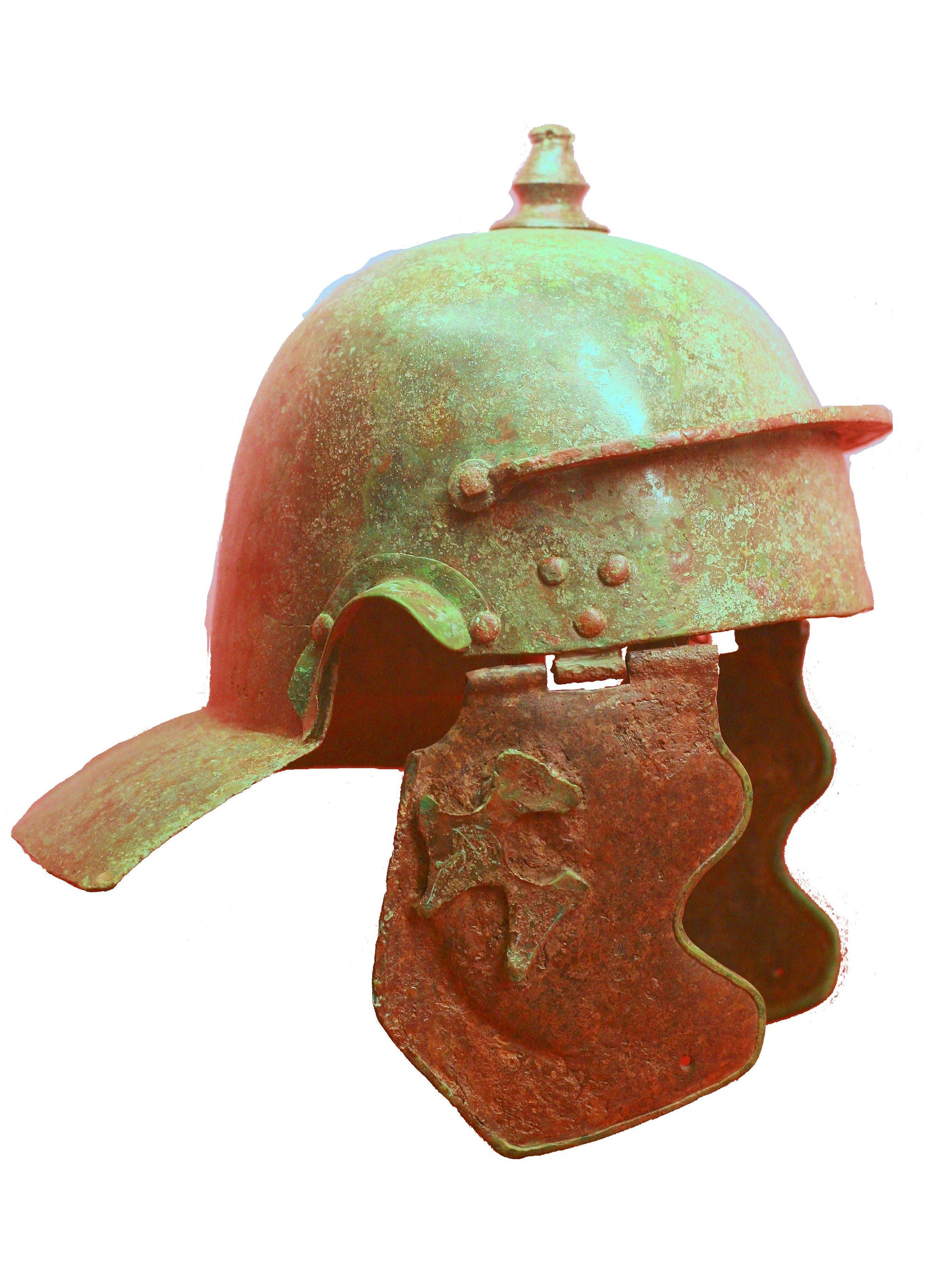
- Roman infantry helmet (late 1st century)
- Active: early 1st century to at least mid-3rd century
- Country: Roman Empire
- Type: Roman auxiliary cohort
- Role: infantry/cavalry
- Size: 600 men (480 infantry, 120 cavalry)
- Garrison/HQ: Germania Superior 80–134; Dacia 179–257

Cohors tertia Delmatarum equitata civium Romanorum pia fidelis ("3rd part-mounted Cohort of Dalmatae Roman citizens, dutiful and loyal", abbreviated COH III D), was a Roman auxiliary cohort mixed infantry and cavalry unit.

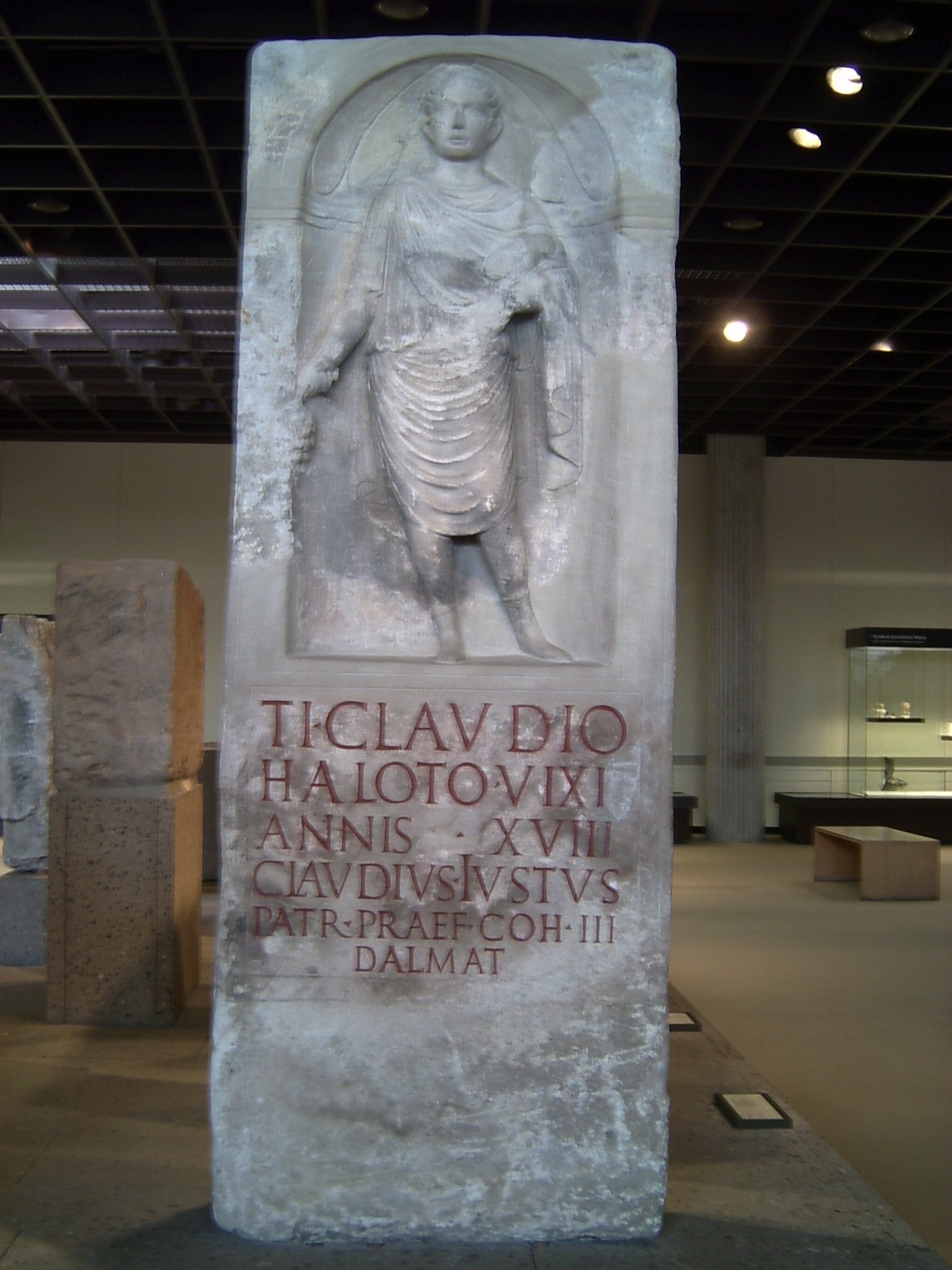
Tombstone of Tiberius Claudius Halotus, erected by his father Claudius Iustus (CIL XIII, 8271)

== Origins ==
It was named after the Dalmatae, an Illyrian-speaking tribe that inhabited the Adriatic coastal mountain range of the eponymous Dalmatia. The ancient geographer Strabo describes these mountains as extremely rugged, and the Dalmatae as backward and warlike. He claims that they did not use money long after their neighbours adopted it and that they "made war on the Romans for a long time". He also criticises the Dalmatae, a nation of pastoralists, for turning fertile plains into sheep pasture. The name of the tribe itself is believed to mean "shepherds", derived from the Illyrian word delme ("sheep"). The final time this people fought against Rome was in the Illyrian revolt of 6–9 AD.

The revolt was started by Dalmatae auxiliary forces and soon spread all over Dalmatia and Pannonia. The resulting war was described by the Roman writer Suetonius as the most difficult faced by Rome since the Punic Wars two centuries earlier. But after the war, the Dalmatae became a loyal and important source of recruits for the Roman army.

The regiment was probably raised by founder-emperor Augustus (r. 30 BC – 14 AD) after 9 AD. Its early movements are unknown.

According to Holder, a total of 12 cohortes Delmatarum appear to have been raised after the suppression of the Illyrian revolt in two series, of seven and five respectively. All these units were in existence by the time of emperor Claudius (r. 41 AD – 54 AD) Of these, nine appear to have survived into the 2nd century.

== Home base ==
It first appears in the datable epigraphic record in 80, in Germania Superior. It was still there in 134. Not later than 179, it was transferred to Dacia where it remained at least until 257–260, the time of its last datable inscription, a stone dedicated to the safety of emperor Gallienus (r. 260–268). Shortly afterwards, Dacia was definitively evacuated by the Roman army and the regiment presumably withdrawn.

Brick or tile stamps of this regiment have been found at the following Roman forts in Germania Superior, at Rottweil, Oberscheidenthal, Grosskrotzenburg, Rückingen, Wiesbaden, all on the line of the Main river. Attestations have also been found at Martinsfeld (Noricum) and Colonia Agrippina (Germania Inferior).

In Dacia the unit has left traces at Dierna, castra of Moldova Veche, Sucidava, Ulpia Traiana Sarmizegetusa, Praetorium (Mehadia) and Porolissum. The latter are the only datable evidence, for early/mid-3rd century.

== Soldiers ==
The name of one praefectus (unit commander), one signifer (standard-bearer) and three caligati (common soldiers) are attested:

- Aurelius Cornelius – veteranus
- Aurelius Proculinus – signifer
- Aurelius Surus – miles
- Antestinus Valentius – miles

== Name and titles ==
The regiment's c.R. title does not appear in the record until 222–35, but must have been granted considerably earlier, as after 212 all inhabitants of the empire were granted Roman citizenship. The regiment also appears to have acquired a number of titles. Pia fidelis first appears in 116. In 222, it was referred to as Alexandriana after emperor Severus Alexander (r.). In 257, it was called Valeriana Galliena after Gallienus. At that time it is also referred to as milliaria (double-strength), likely a late upgrading. The last epigraphical record mentioning the unit dates around 268.

== See also ==
- List of Roman auxiliary regiments
