= Castra of Gherla =

Fort in the Roman province of Dacia

- Location within Romania
- 47.02321°N 23.89439°E
- Location: Gherla, Cluj, Romania

History
- Founded: 2nd century AD
- Abandoned: 3rd century AD

Site notes
- Condition: Ruined

The Roman fort at Gherla was one of the important military installations in the Roman province of Dacia, built in the 2nd century AD on the right bank of the Someșul Mic River, near the present-day Romanian town of Gherla. Integral to the support of the Limes Porolissensis, the defensive network that controlled access into the interior of the province, the strategic placement of the Gherla fort ensured swift communication with major military centres. Among these were the legion fortresses of Potaissa and Apulum, as well as the Someșul Mare River fortresses. The Gherla castra continued to function until Aurelian's formal relinquishment of the Dacian province around 271-275 AD, resulting in its abandonment.

The fort was first constructed around 106 AD, shortly after the conquest of Dacia by Emperor Trajan. This initial phase of the construction consisted of wood and earthworks, with approximate dimensions of 145 × 138 meters. Around 138-143 AD, towards the denouement of Emperor Hadrian's reign and the beginning of his successor Antoninus Pius' rule, the fort was rebuilt in stone and expanded to approximately 169 × 162 meters.

The Gherla castra was also the garrison-place of the Ala II Pannoniorum. Originally recruited from the Roman province of Pannonia, this Roman auxiliary cavalry unit's role was to patrol roads and maintain control over the northern region of Roman Dacia. Following their participation in the Dacian Wars of Trajan, the Ala came to be stationed in the (then) newly-formed province, where they erected the initial rudimentary timber structure. A vicus—a civilian settlement—subsequently developed around the fort, along with a cemetery and various administrative and commercial structures.

The exact ancient name of the settlement at Gherla is not known with certainty. Several names were initially proposed, among them “Congri,” “Optatiana,” or “Ad Pannonios,” but modern research has shown that the latter two names corresponded to other Roman sites in Dacia.

The first significant archaeological excavations at the Gherla castra took place between 1901 and 1909, led by archaeologists József Ornstein and Endre Orosz. They produced the first plans of the fort and identified buildings such as the central principia, the headquarters of the Roman military command. Further investigations and surveys were carried out in the 1930-60s. Following the announcement of a development project that threatened to destroy the site, rescue excavations were organised between 1981-1983. Indeed, the construction of the wood-processing plant destroyed much of the site; today, only fragments of the southeastern corner of the fort remain.

Representing one of the most important pieces of evidence of Roman presence in northern Transylvania, the Roman fort at Gherla is listed as a historic monument in Romania.

== See also ==
- List of castra
