= Optatiana (castra) =

- Castra of Sutoru
- Location within Romania
- 46.9866°N 23.2404°E
- Location: Gura Căpușului, Sutoru, Sălaj, Romania

History
- Founded: 2nd century AD
- Built: Trajan
- Abandoned: 3rd century AD

Site notes
- Condition: Ruined

Optatiana was a fort in the Roman province of Dacia. The ruins are located on the left bank of Almaș river, in the village of Sutoru.

It was located on the former road between Napoca and Largiana/Porolissum and like the other forts of Limes Porolissensis it was constructed in two phases: an initial wood and earth structure, and a second one from stone. During the second phase it reached a size of 165x 200m. It is possible that numerus Mauretorum was stationed at the location.

== See also ==
- List of castra
