= Cumidava (castra) =

Fort in the Roman province of Dacia

- Castra of Râșnov
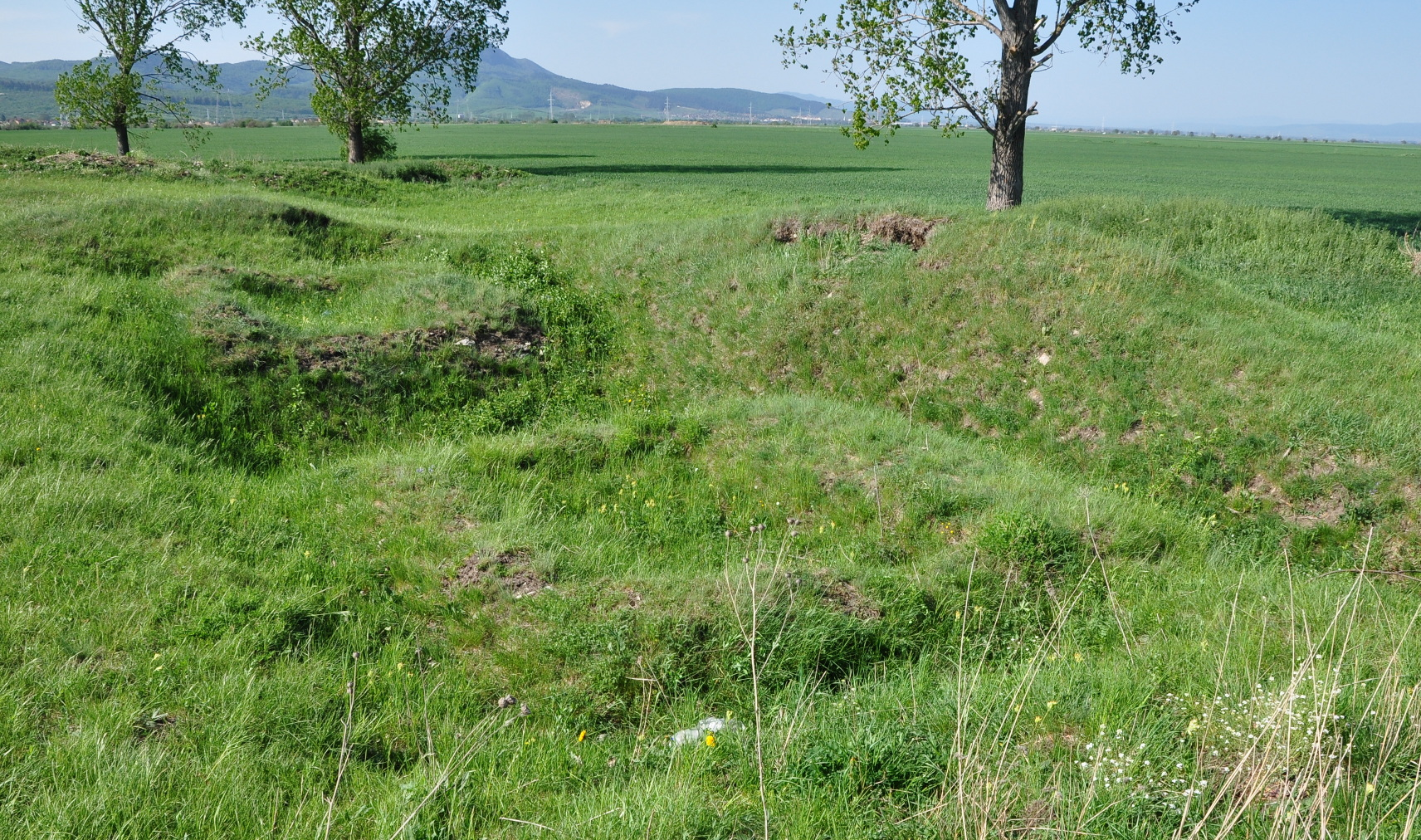
- Ruins of the Northeastern gate (2013)

- Location within Romania
- 45.618707°N 25.441580°E
- Location: Grădişte, Erdenburg, Eulenburg, Orlenburg, Râșnov, Brașov

History
- Founded: 2nd century AD

Site notes
- Elevation: 608 m (1,995 ft)
- Excavation dates: 1939, 1969 - 1970
- Archaeologists: M. J. Ackner, Mihail Macrea, Constantin Daicoviciu
- Discovered: 1856
- Condition: Ruined

Cumidava was a fort in the Roman province of Dacia Apulensis. It is located at 4 km (2.5 mi) northwest of the city Râșnov, Romania near the city of Vulcan. The site is located on the middle terrace of Bârsa River.

It was part of the Roman frontier system of the Limes Transalutanus in a strategic position to the north of the Rucăr–Bran Pass.

It was a large fort sufficient for a milliaria or quingenaria equitata cohort.

Several overlapping forts from different phases have been found. The earliest wooden and earth fort from the time of Trajan measured 110x114 m surrounded by a 10 m wide and 2 m high earth mound and defensive ditch of depth 2 m on the NW and SW sides. The second construction phase was a stone fort of 118 × 124 m with the porta praetoria on the NE side and walls 1.5-1.7 m thick. On the NE and SE sides the wall was laid in the ditch of the wood and earth phase, the ditch behind being filled with the bank of the earth and wood phase. On the NE and SE sides were three defensive ditches of 5×1.75 m, 5.50×1.25 m and 1.65×0.80 m, while on the SW side two trenches (3×1.25 m, 2.80×1 m), and a single trench on the NW side. This phase dates to the later reign of Hadrian or the beginning of Antoninus Pius.

In 2016, as part of the LIMES National Program, geophysical surveys revealed a smaller fort (castellum) about 40 m east of the large fort and approximately 73×50 m, predating the stone fort. Approximately 78 m NNE of the stone fort a building consisting of two rooms with a semicircular apse oriented to the NW was found.

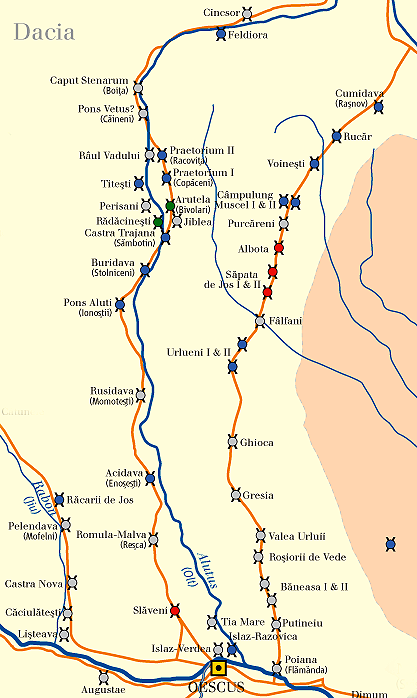
Forts on Limes Transalutanus (to the right)

plan of the fort showing oblique layout of roads, gates etc.

== Garrison ==
It was occupied by only two cohorts Vindelicorum Cumidavensis (cohors IV and cohors IV Nova) who had taken the name Cumidava (Komidava of Ptolemy) as testified by an inscription found in the fort. The IV Vindelicorum, a peditata quingenaria cohort, was moved from Arzbach to Râșnov sometime in the beginning of the 3rd century and built a similar fort to that at Arzbach judging by the unusual character of the ancillary buildings inside. Notably the headquarters building has a length-to-width ratio is reversed in relation to that of the fort, and there is a narrow courtyard, similar to the one at Râșnov.

== Inscriptions ==
An inscription from 3rd century AD dedicated to Iulia Mamea was found here:

== See also ==
- List of castra

== Notes ==
=== Works cited ===
- Dapper, Morgan De (2009). Ol' Man River: Geo-archaeological Aspects of Rivers and River Plains. Academia Press. ISBN 978-90-382-1404-7.
- Treptow, Kurt W.; Bolovan, Ioan (1996). Treptow, Kurt W.; Bolovan, Ioan (eds.). A History of Romania. East European Monographs. ISBN 978-0-88033-345-0.
