= Castra of Olteni =

Fort in the Roman province of Dacia

- Location within Romania
- 45.97094°N 25.84962°E
- Location: Mikó Castle, Olteni, Covasna, Romania

History
- Founded: 2nd century AD
- Built: Hadrian or Antoninus Pius
- Abandoned: 3rd century AD

Site notes
- Excavation dates: 1962; 1978; 1990
- Archaeologists: Zoltan Székely
- Condition: Ruined

The castra of Olteni was a fort in the Roman province of Dacia. It was built in the 2nd century AD. The archaeological site yielded coins issued by the Roman emperors Titus Flavius Vespasianus, Domitian, Trajan, Antoninus Pius, Elagabal and Alexander Severus. The fort was abandoned in the 3rd century. It ruins are located in Olteni (Hungarian: Oltszem) in commune Bodoc (Hungarian: Sepsibodok) in Romania.

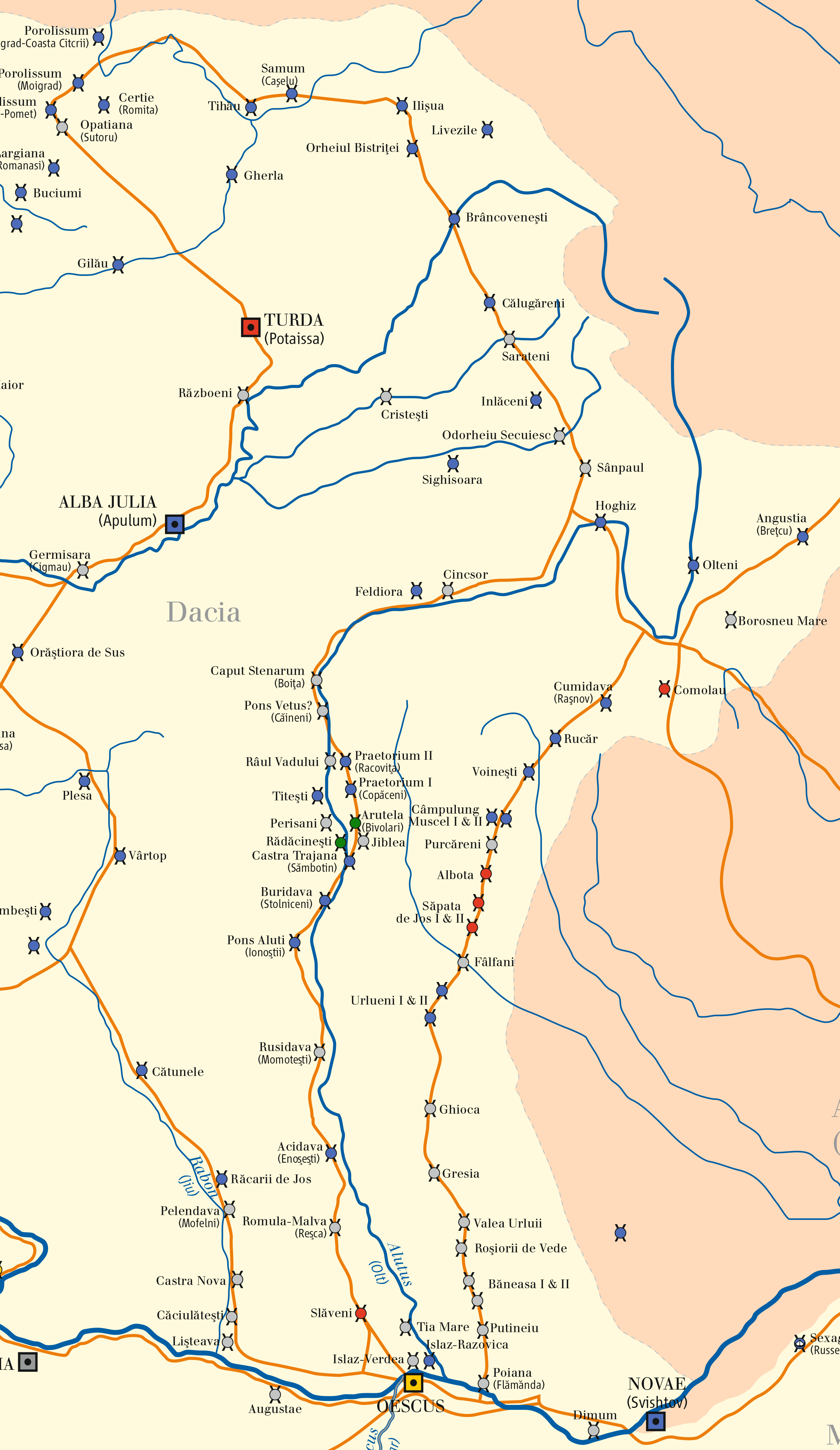
Limes Alutanus + Transalutanus

The plan of castra.

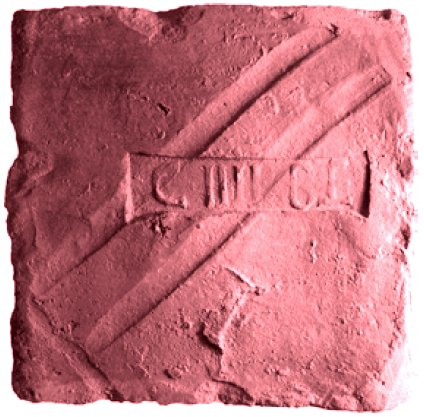
Inscription C IIII BE on stamped brick found at Olteni

== See also ==
- List of castra
