= Castra of Slăveni =

Fort in the Roman province of Dacia

- The plan of castra

- Location within Romania
- 44.081789°N 24.528968°E
- Location: La cetate, Slăveni, Olt, Romania

History
- Founded: 2nd century AD

Site notes
- Excavation dates: 1893
- Archaeologists: Pamfil Polonic
- Condition: Ruined

Castra of Slăveni was a fort in the Roman province of Dacia.

== See also ==
- List of castra
