= Castra of Odorheiu Secuiesc =

Fort in the Roman province of Dacia

- Location within Romania
- 46.305727°N 25.296303°E
- Location: Cetatea medievală, Odorheiu Secuiesc, Harghita, Romania

History
- Founded: 1st century AD
- Abandoned: 3rd century AD

Site notes
- Condition: Ruined

The castra of Odorheiu Secuiesc was a fort built in the 1st century AD. A nearby contemporary settlement was also archeologically identified. The castra and the settlement were abandoned in the 3rd century. Their ruins are located in Odorheiu Secuiesc (Hungarian: Székelyudvarhely) in Romania. At the same settlement, the ruins of a Roman tower can also be identified at Piatra Coţofană (Hungarian: Szarkakő).

== See also ==
- List of castra
