= Castra of Triphulum =

Fort in the Roman province of Dacia

Triphulum
- Castra of Orheiu Bistriței
- Location within Romania
- 47.096014°N 24.592319°E
- Location: Orheiu Bistriței, Bistrița-Năsăud, Romania

History
- Founded: 2nd century AD
- Abandoned: 3rd century AD

Site notes
- Excavation dates: 1960; 1968
- Archaeologists: Mihail Macrea; Dumitru Protase
- Condition: Ruined

Triphulum was a fort in the Roman province of Dacia. It was built in the 2nd century AD. Archaeological research also identified the nearby vicus. The castra and the nearby settlement were both abandoned in the 3rd century AD. The ruins of the fort are located in Orheiu Bistriței (commune Cetate, Romania).

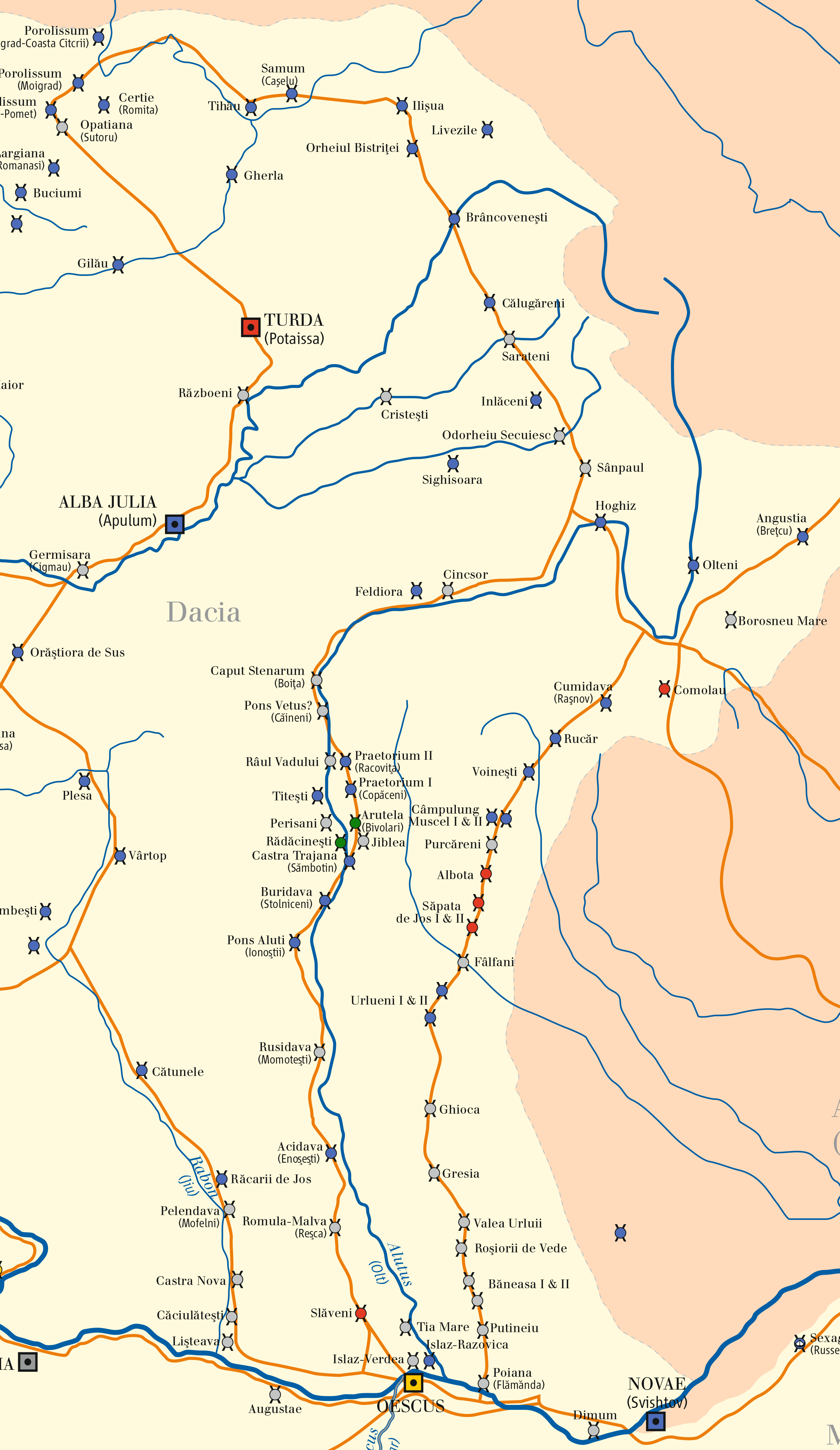
Limes Alutanus + Transalutanus

Orheiu Bistriței, Principia

== Location ==
The remains of the fort lie on flat ground on the western side of the Budac river, on the western periphery of today's town. Part of the rear part of the camp lies under the disused Protestant cemetery. The fort could have played a strategically important role as the Castra of Livezile fort 7 km away was only used temporarily, and it was located on the approximately 85 km route between the Ilișua fort and the Castra of Brâncovenești fort.

== See also ==
- List of castra
- de:Kastell Orheiu Bistriței
