= Stenarum (castra) =

- Castra of Sighișoara
- Location within Romania
- 46°14′21.95″N 24°45′7.57″E
- Location: Platoul Podmoale, Sighișoara, Mureș, Romania

History
- Founded: 2nd century AD

Site notes
- Condition: Ruined

Stenarum was a fort in the Roman province of Dacia near the present town of Sighișoara, Romania.

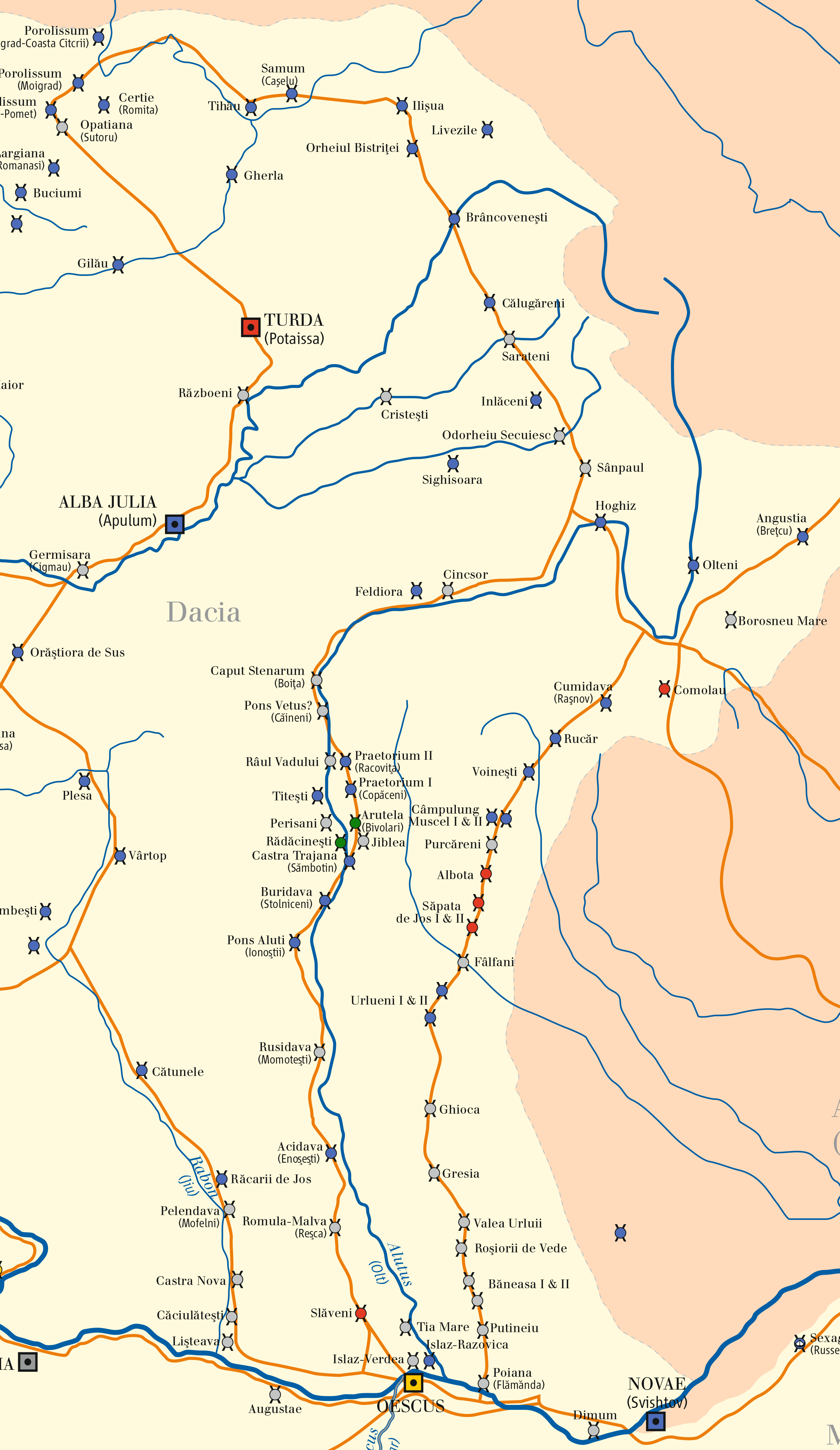
Limes Alutanus + Transalutanus

== See also ==
- List of castra
