= Arcobara (castra) =

Roman fort in Dacia

- Castra of Ilișua; Castra of Uriu
- The plan of castra.

- Location within Romania
- 47.210528°N 24.095361°E
- Location: Platoul Măgura, Ilișua, Bistrița-Năsăud, Romania

History
- Founded: 2nd century AD

Site notes
- Elevation: 267 m (876 ft)
- Excavation dates: 1836; 1980
- Archaeologists: Jozsef Torma; Karoly Torma; Dumitru Protase; Corneliu Gaiu
- Condition: Ruined

Arcobara (previously identified as Arcobadara) also known as Castra of Ilișua was a fort in the Roman province of Dacia in the 2nd and 3rd centuries AD. It was unearthed in the village Ilişua (commune Uriu, Romania) in 1978. The fort was garrisoned by Ala I Tungrorum Frontoniana. On the site 27 stone ballista projectiles were discovered of diameters between 7 and 13.5 cm and weighing up to 2 kg indicating the presence of ballistarii.

== History ==
Three phases of the castra are known:

1.The earth and timber fort was established.

2.Possibly during the early years of Hadrian's reign ala Tungrorum Frontoniana was stationed here, leading to an enlargement of the fort.

3.The last phase of the fort included a leveling of some of the previous buildings and fortifications and the construction of stone walls.

== See also ==
- List of castra
- Limes Porolissensis
