= Praetoria Augusta (castra) =

- Castra of Inlăceni
- Location within Romania
- 46.4322°N 25.1210°E
- Location: Cetate, Inlăceni, Harghita, Romania

History
- Founded: 2nd century AD

Site notes
- Discovered: 1858
- Condition: Ruined

Praetoria Augusta was a fort in the Roman province of Dacia.

== See also ==
- List of castra
