= Largiana (castra) =

- Castra of Românași; Largina
- Location within Romania
- 47.1069°N 23.1724°E
- Location: Românași, Sălaj, Romania

History
- Founded: 2nd century AD
- Built: Trajan

Site notes
- Condition: Ruined

Largiana was a fort in the Roman province of Dacia. It was located near Românași, Sălaj, on a promontory overlooking the valley of river Agrij. Its main function was to guard the intersection between the road from Porolissum to Napoca and the road from Porolissum to castra of Bologa.

The castra was initially constructed of timber on a rectangular plan, 122 x 152 m, and was protected by two ditches. It was later reconstructed and extended using stone, on a 130 x 155 m rectangular surface.

Another auxiliary fort was discovered close by but the two forts probably did not function simultaneously.

== See also ==
- List of castra
- Limes Porolissensis
