= Castra of Boroșneu Mare =

Fort in the Roman province of Dacia

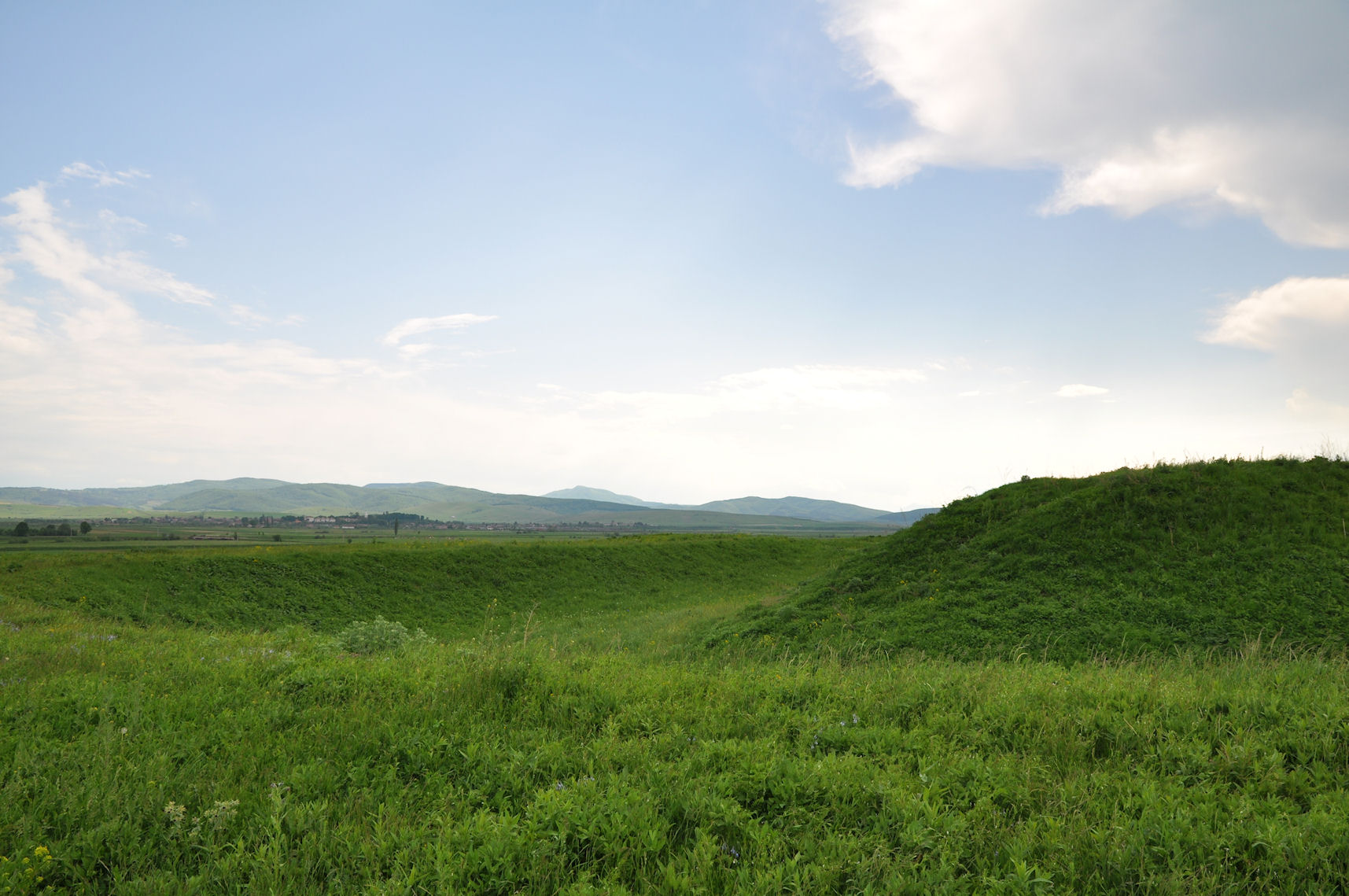
- Panoramic view

- Location within Romania
- 45.843860°N 26.016985°E
- Location: Dealul cetății, Boroșneu Mare, Covasna County, Romania

History
- Founded: 2nd century AD
- Built: Trajan
- Abandoned: 3rd century AD

Site notes
- Elevation: 540 m (1,770 ft)
- Excavation dates: 1911; 1914; 1943; 1947; 1973 - 1974
- Archaeologists: Vilmos Csutak; Ferenc László; Zoltan Székely
- Condition: Ruined

Castra of Boroșneu Mare was a fort in the Roman province of Dacia in the 2nd and 3rd centuries AD. A contemporary settlement was also unearthed at the fort. Its ruins are located in Boroșneu Mare (Hungarian: Nagyborosnyó) in Romania.

Its garrison was Cohors I Bracaraugustanorum.

== See also ==
- List of castra
