= Castra of Brâncovenești =

Fort in the Roman province of Dacia

- Location within Romania
- 46.86184°N 24.76859°E
- Location: Castel, Brâncovenești, Mureș, Romania

History
- Founded: 2nd century AD
- Abandoned: 3rd century AD

Site notes
- Excavation dates: 1977
- Archaeologists: Ioan I. Russu; Dumitru Protase
- Condition: Ruined

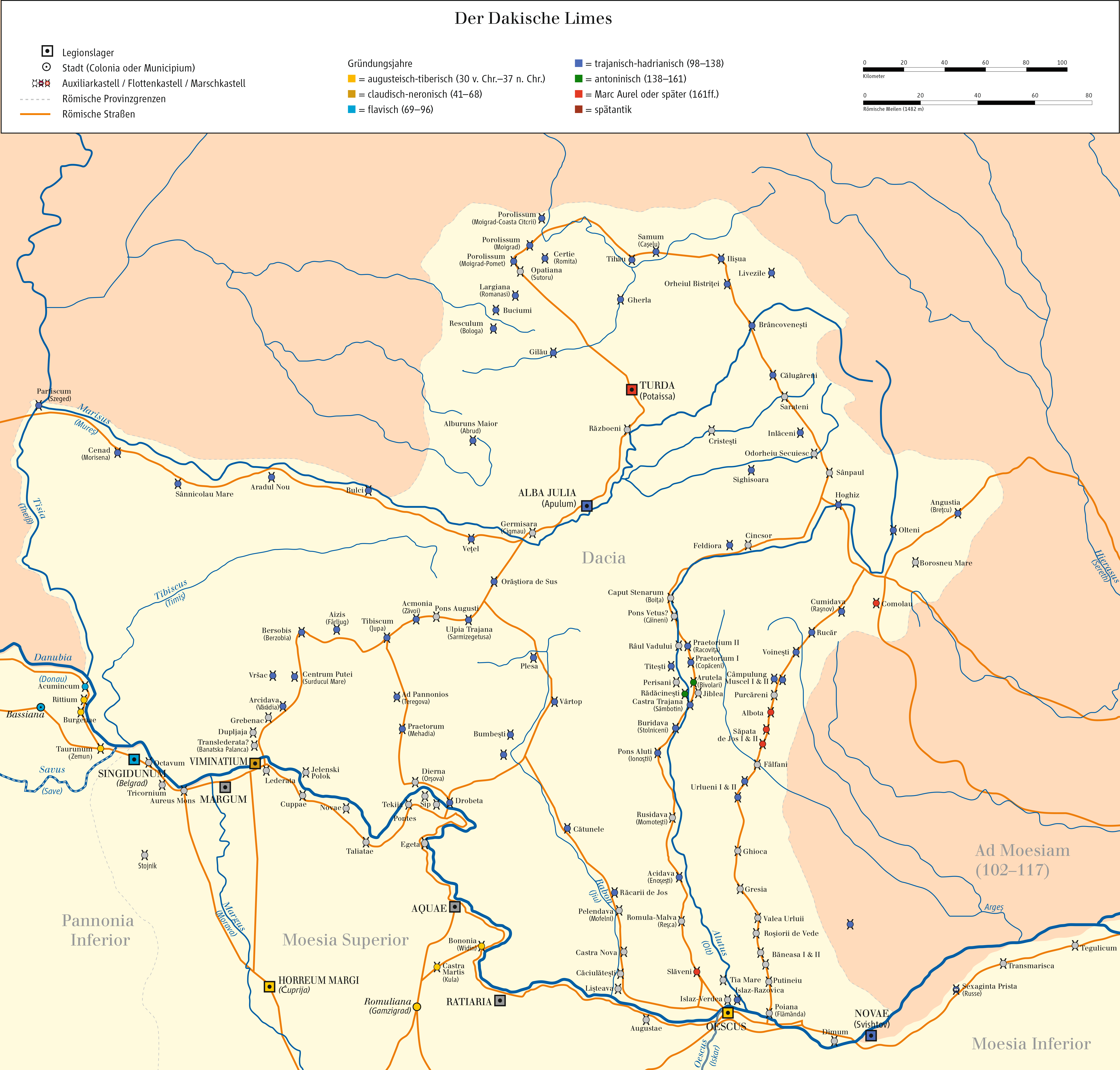
Roman settlements in Dacia at various times. The castra of Brâncovenești is located in the Northeast near the border of Roman control.

The castra of Brâncovenești, also known as Patridava, was a fort in the Roman province of Dacia in the 2nd and 3rd centuries AD. Its ruins are located in Brâncovenești, Romania.

== See also ==
- List of castra
