= Dierna (castra) =

- Castra of Orșova; Tierna
- Location within Romania
- 44.7382°N 22.40764°E
- Location: Orșova, Mehedinți, Romania

History
- Built: Trajan

Site notes
- Elevation: 85 m (279 ft)
- Condition: Ruined

Dierna was a city and fort in the Roman province of Dacia, located near and beneath the present-day town of Orșova, Romania. The vicus of the fort later grew into a city. The Roman city of Dierna (Tierna) got its name from the Černа river that flows through Orșova, the corresponding ancient Dierna.

The Roman city is today 6 m beneath the Danube after the Iron Gates Dam raised the water level. Drawings from the 18th century show that Roman Dierna had a military port near the fort and an extensive civil port along the banks of the Danube. The Roman settlement at the confluence of the river Cerna with the Danube developed as a result of the port that was established here probably in the Flavian dynasty when the two fleets that controlled river navigation were created: Classis Flavia Pannonica and Classis Flavia Moesica.

Epigraphic records indicate that the Roman settlement prospered especially from the collection of customs and Danube crossing taxes due to its strategic position and became a municipium under Septimius Severus.

The Roman fort also had its own wharf, separated from the rest of the port by walls as are found at other Roman forts on the Danube.

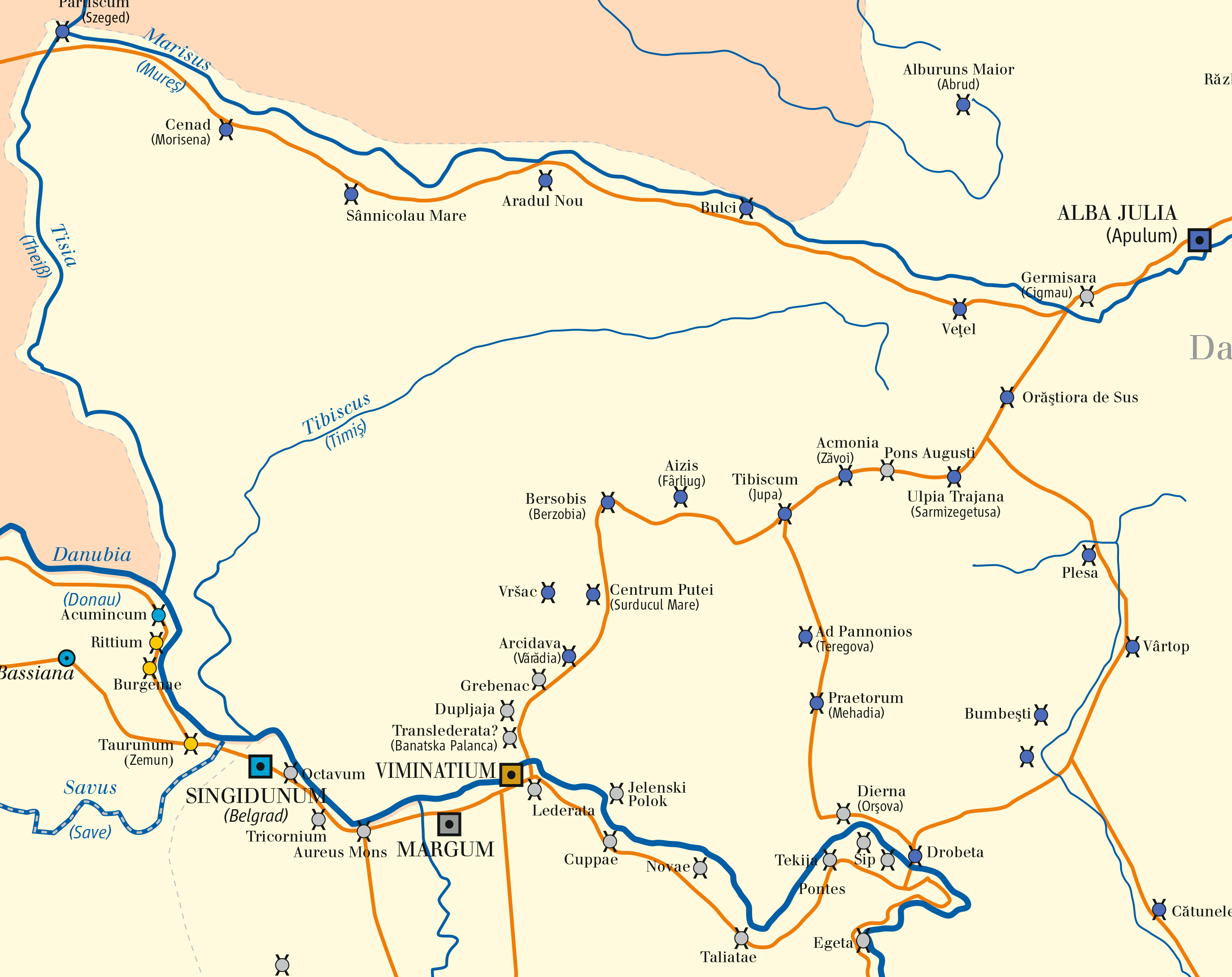
Western Dacia forts, roads and cities

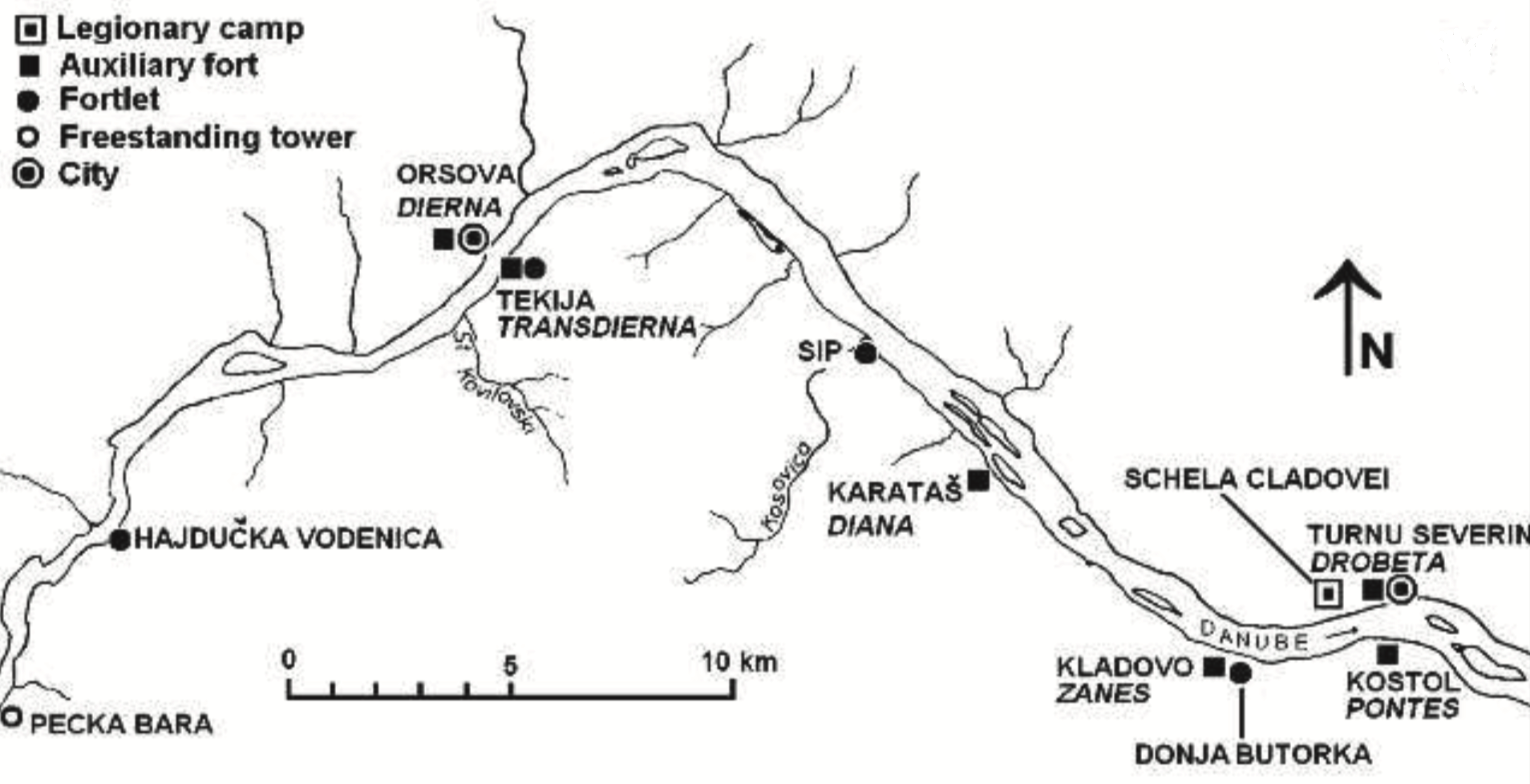
Western Moesian Limes

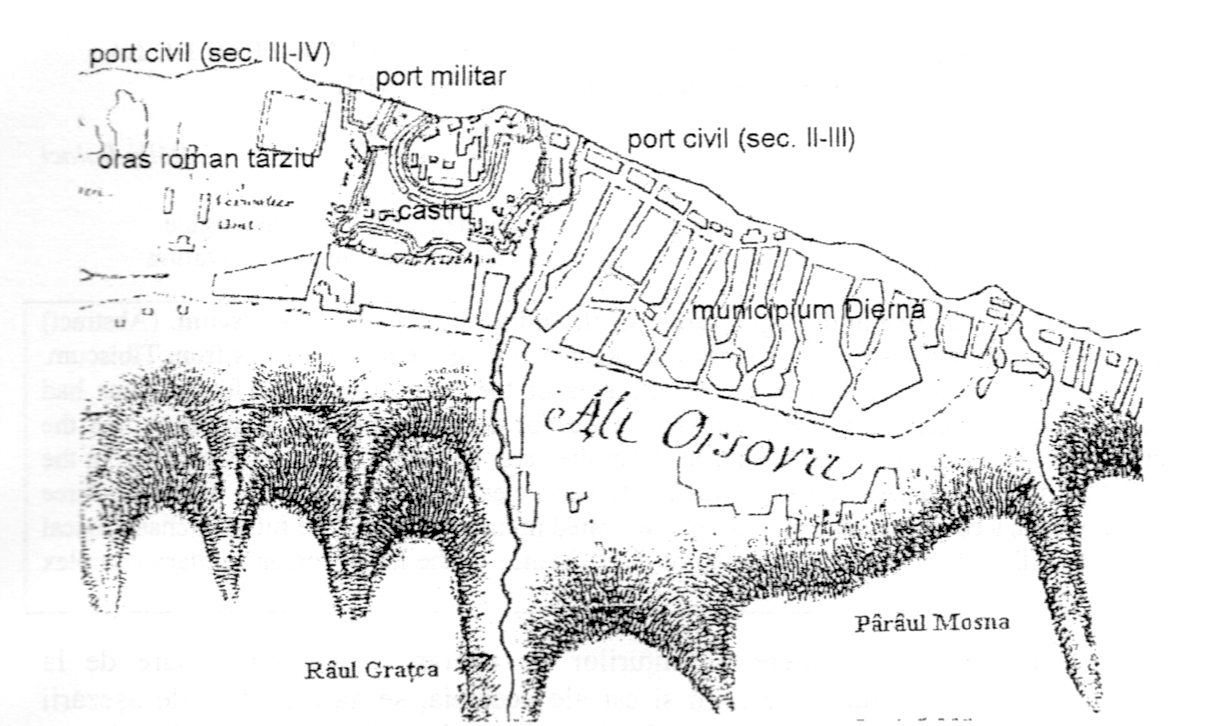
18th c. Map of ancient Dierna sites

== See also ==
- List of castra
