= Bodoc, Covasna =

Bodoc Sepsibodok
- Commune
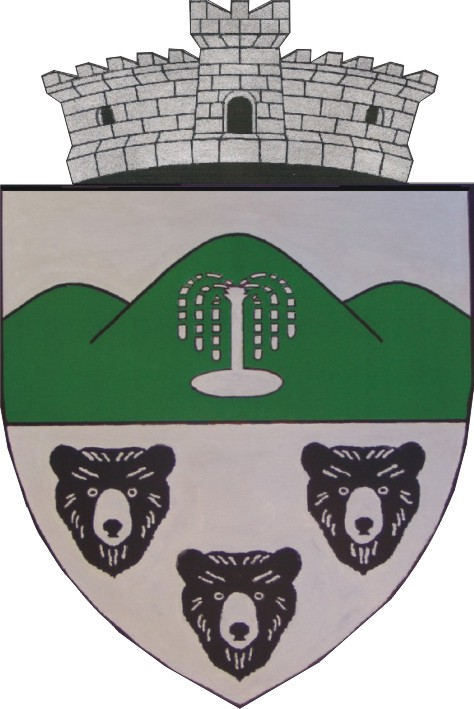
- Coat of arms

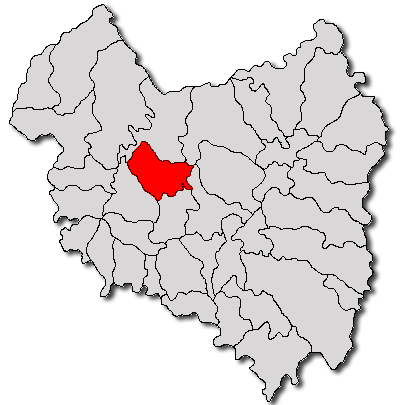
- Location in Covasna County

- Location in Romania
- Coordinates: 45°57′N 25°51′E
- Country: Romania
- County: Covasna

Government
  - Mayor (2020–2024): István Fodor (UDMR)
- Area: 33.53 km^{2} (12.95 sq mi)
- Elevation: 549 m (1,801 ft)
- Population (2021-12-01): 2,481
  - Density: 74/km^{2} (190/sq mi)
- Time zone: EET/EEST (UTC+2/+3)
- Postal code: 527035
- Area code: (+40) 02 67
- Vehicle reg.: CV
- Website: bodok.ro

Bodoc (Hungarian: Sepsibodok, Hungarian pronunciation: [ʃɛpʃibodok]) is a commune in Covasna County, Transylvania, Romania composed of three villages: Bodoc, Olteni (Oltszem), and Zălan (Zalán).

The commune is located in the central part of the county, on the banks of the Olt River. It formed part of the Székely Land region of the historical Transylvania province.

The Bodoc train station serves the CFR Main Line 400, which connects Brașov with the northwestern city of Satu Mare.

== Demographics ==
Bodoc has an absolute Székely Hungarian majority. According to the 2002 census, it had a population of 2,541, of which 94.77% or 2,408 were Hungarian. At the 2021 census, the commune had a population of 2,481, of which 90.08% were Hungarian, 3.14% Romanian, and 1.53% Roma.
