= Castra of Bumbești-Jiu – Vârtop =

Fort in the Roman province of Dacia

Castra of Bumbești-Jiu - Vârtop
- Location within Romania
- 45.155281°N 23.372697°E
- Location: Vârtop, Bumbești-Jiu, Gorj, Romania

History
- Founded: 2nd century AD
- Abandoned: 2nd century AD

Site notes
- Elevation: 280 m (920 ft)
- Excavation dates: 1897; 1956
- Archaeologists: Grigore Tocilescu
- Condition: Ruined

The castra of Bumbești-Jiu now known as Vârtop was a fort in the Roman province of Dacia. It is located 35 m west of the Târgu Jiu - Petroșani road, in Bumbești-Jiu (Romania). It defended and secured the entrance to the Jiului gorge and the Roman road from Bumbești through Porceni over the mountains, through the Vâlcan Pass to Sarmisegetuza.

The fort was built between the two Dacian Wars (101-102 and 105–106). Traces of a vicus (civilian settlement) were found nearby.

The earth and wood fort measures 126 m × 115 m. It was surrounded by an earth mound 14 m wide and 0.5–2 m high, a ditch 0.5 m deep and 11 m wide.

It seems that this fort ceased to be used as soon as the Castra of Bumbești-Jiu - Gară was built 800 m to the south.

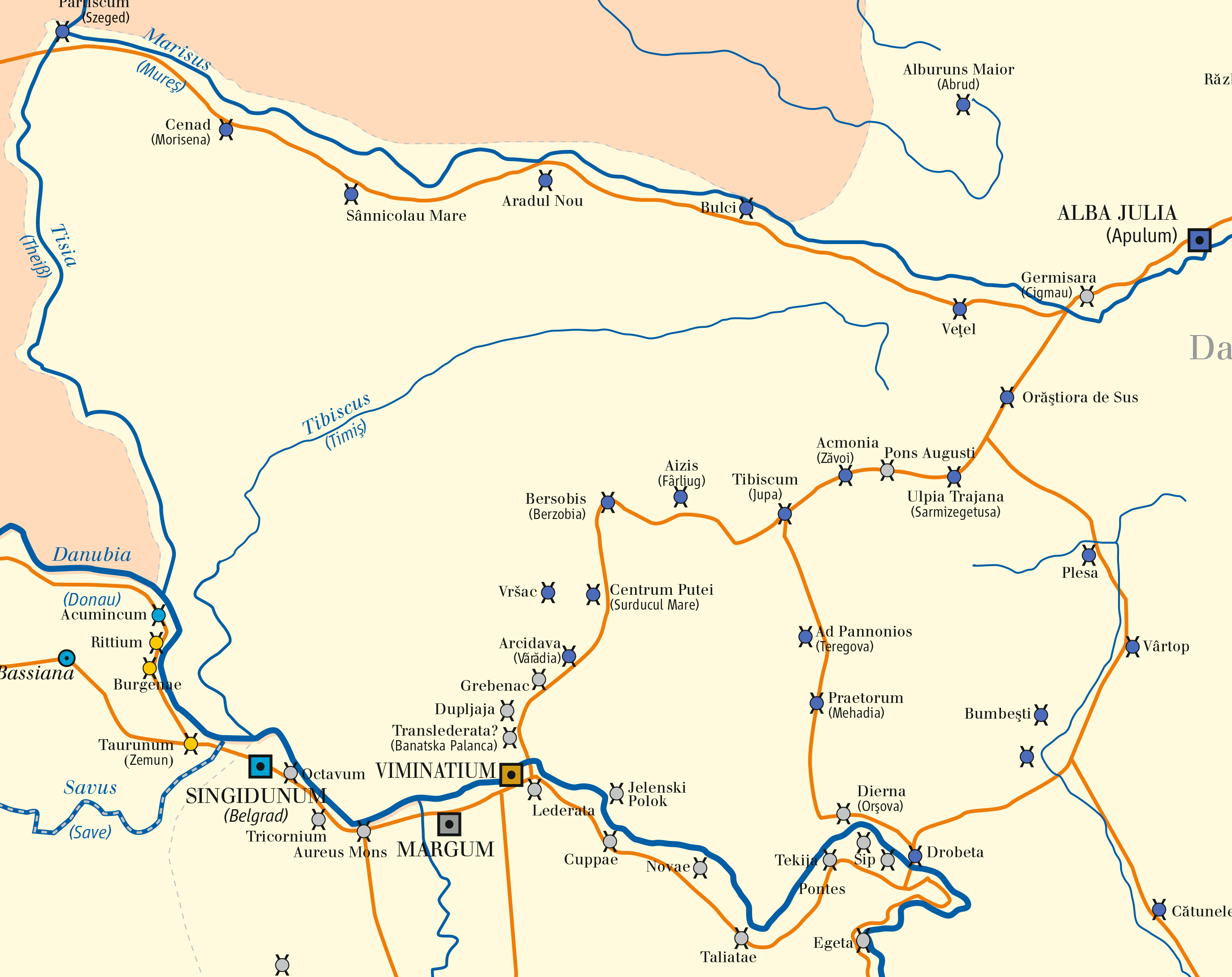
Western Dacia forts

== See also ==
- List of castra
