= Samum (castrum) =

- Castrum of Cășei; Castrum of Cășeiu
- Location within Romania
- 47.1862°N 23.8374°E
- Location: Cetățele, Cășeiu, Cluj, Romania

History
- Founded: 101/102
- Built: Trajan
- Abandoned: 270/275

Site notes
- Elevation: 230 m (750 ft)
- Excavation dates: 1926–1929; 1989; 1995–2000; 2004
- Archaeologists: Dan Isac; Emil Panaitescu; Sorin Cociș
- Condition: Ruined

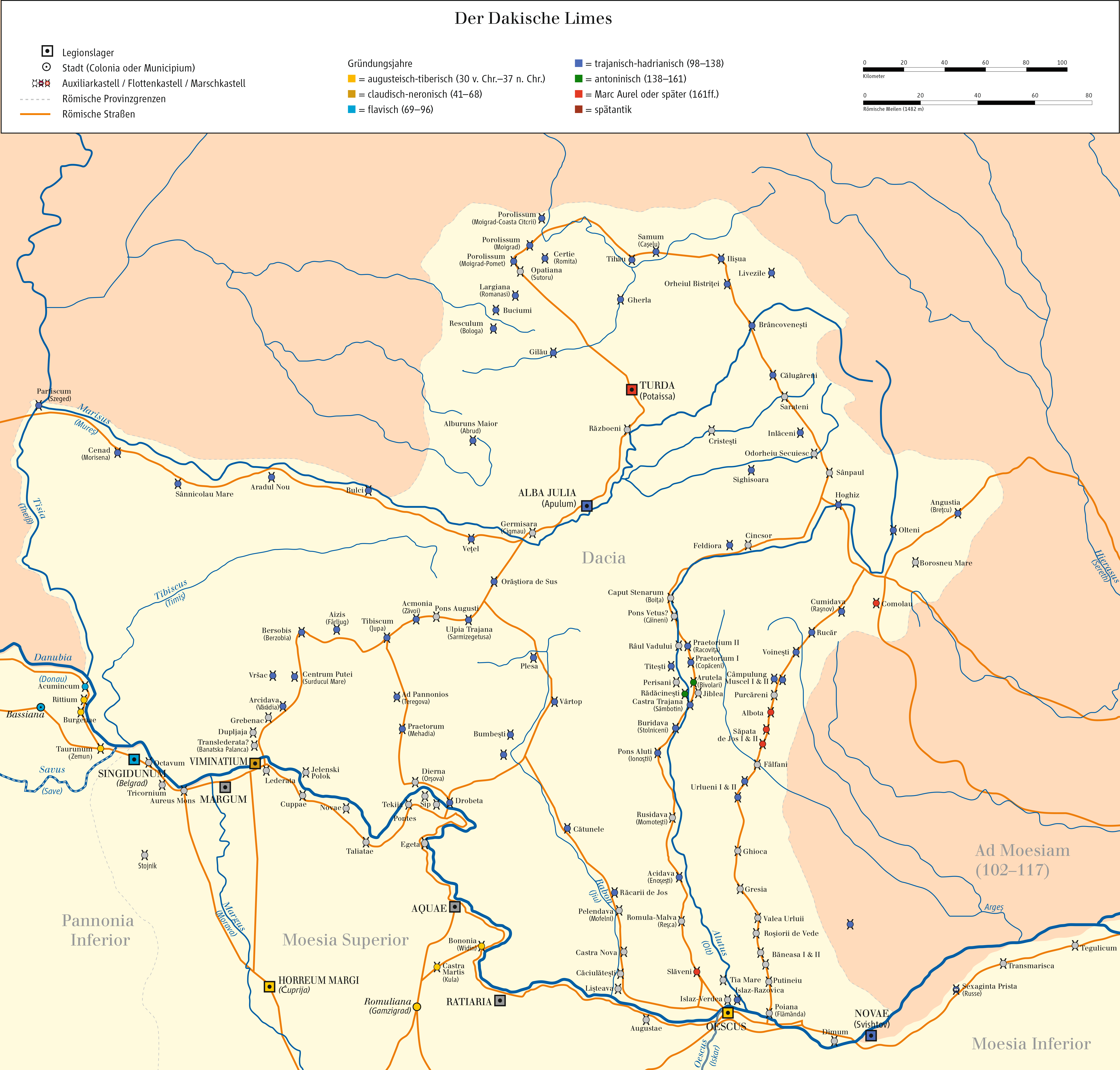
Map of the Limes in Dacia

Samum was a castrum (fort) in the Roman province of Dacia, situated at the very northern border of that territory. It lay on the right (northern) side of the river Someș, in historical and later known as Transylvania, in of present Romania. Remnants of this relatively small fortified camp lie within the cadastre of village Cășeiu (near the town of Dej), 1 kilometre (0.62 mi) on the southwest edge of the village.

This castrum in a typical square shape was built as an auxiliary military camp at the beginning of the 2nd century, in times of the Emperor Trajan, while it was fully abandoned by the army (together with whole province of Dacia) after 270 AD, when Emperor Aurelian decided to give up the difficult-to-defend province. Traces of late Roman or post-Roman habitation have been noted.

== History ==
Like the other forts of Limes Porolissensis, it was initially built out of earth and wood just after the end of Trajan's Dacian Wars, and later rebuilt from stone. One particularity at Samum is the lack of archaeological evidence of a wooden palisade on top of the vallum.

An inscription commemorating Julia Domna provided a clue to the timeframe when the fort defences were rebuilt from stone, a hypothesis confirmed by recent excavations.

== Excavations ==
The site is famous for being the source of a Roman inscription identified among the materials taken from it to build the Heller Castle in Coplean. The inscription (CIL III 827) was raised by Valerius Valentinus, a beneficiarius at the fort, for the goddess Nemesis and it is the first discovered mention of Samum castra. A line reading "…subsi[g](navit) Samum cum reg(ione) (tr)ans val(um)…" was interpreted by archaeologist Károly Torma as evidence of a regio transvalum which prompted him to look for its location, eventually leading to the discovery of the Roman ruins at Poieni and Bologa, and the beginning of Limes Porolissensis archaeological study.

== See also ==
- List of castra
- Limes Porolissensis
