= Castra of Reci =

Fort in the Roman province of Dacia

- Castra of Comolău
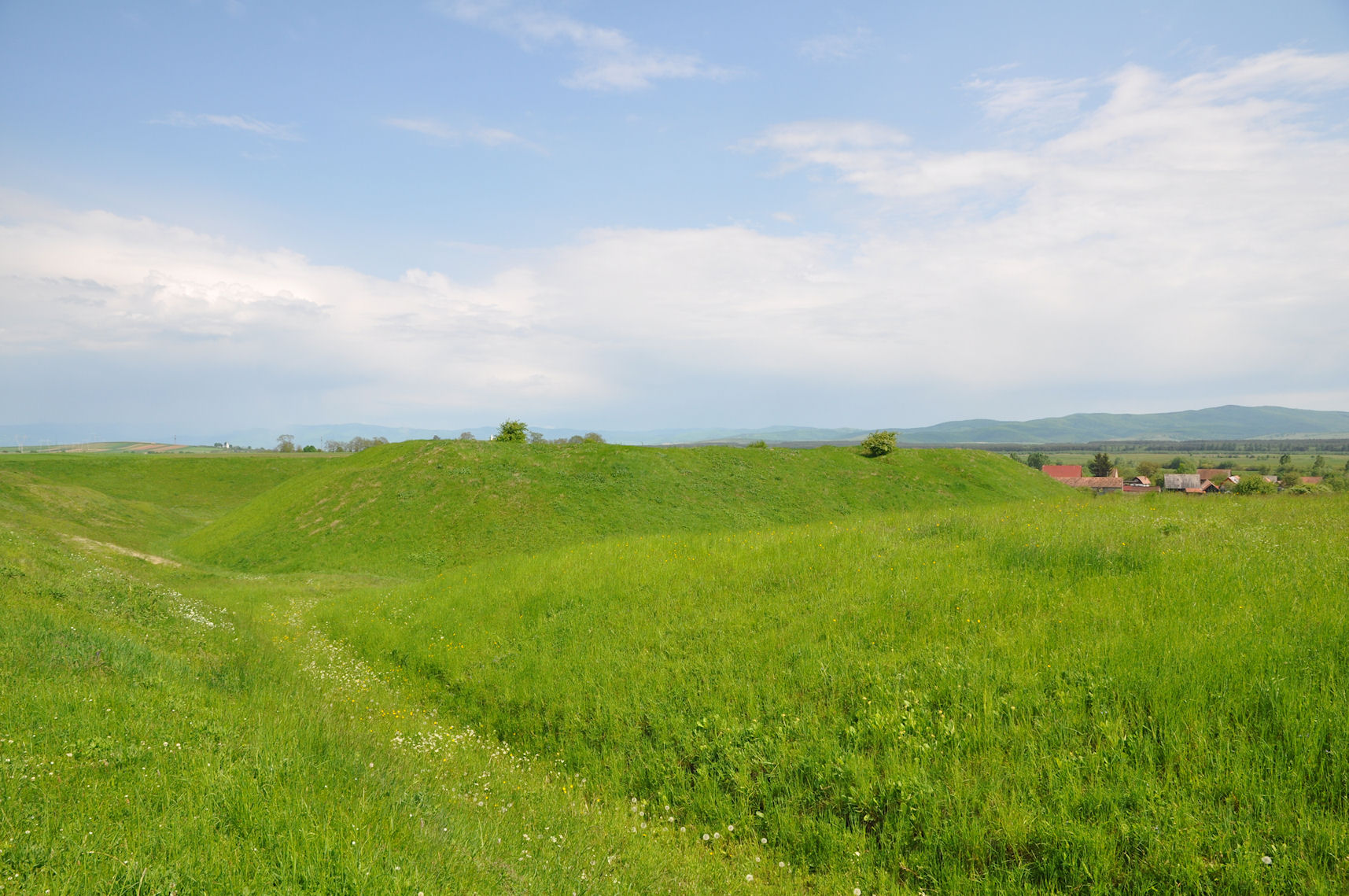
- Panoramic view

- Location within Romania
- 45.844173°N 25.900222°E
- Location: Reci, Covasna, Romania

History
- Founded: 2nd century AD
- Abandoned: 3rd century AD

Site notes
- Elevation: 527 m (1,729 ft)
- Condition: Ruined

Castra of Reci was a fort in the Roman province of Dacia.

== See also ==
- List of castra
