= Castra of Bumbești-Jiu – Gară =

Fort in the Roman province of Dacia

Castra of Bumbești-Jiu - Gară
- Location within Romania
- 45.183220°N 23.384921°E
- Location: Gară, Bumbești-Jiu, Gorj, Romania

History
- Founded: 2nd century AD
- Abandoned: 3rd century AD

Site notes
- Elevation: 310 m (1,020 ft)
- Excavation dates: 1897, 1983 - 1992, 1994 - 1996, 1998 - 2000, 2002 - 2008
- Archaeologists: B. Mariana Marcu, Cristian Vlădescu, Dumitru Hortopan
- Discovered: 1897
- Condition: Ruined

The castra of Bumbești-Jiu now known as Gară was a fort in the Roman province of Dacia located in Bumbești-Jiu (Romania). It replaced the nearby earlier fort of Castra of Bumbești-Jiu – Vârtop in the 2nd century AD. It defended and secured the entrance to the Jiului gorge and the Roman road from Bumbești through Porceni over the mountains, through the Vâlcan Pass to Sarmisegetuza.

A contemporary settlement was also unearthed at the fort.

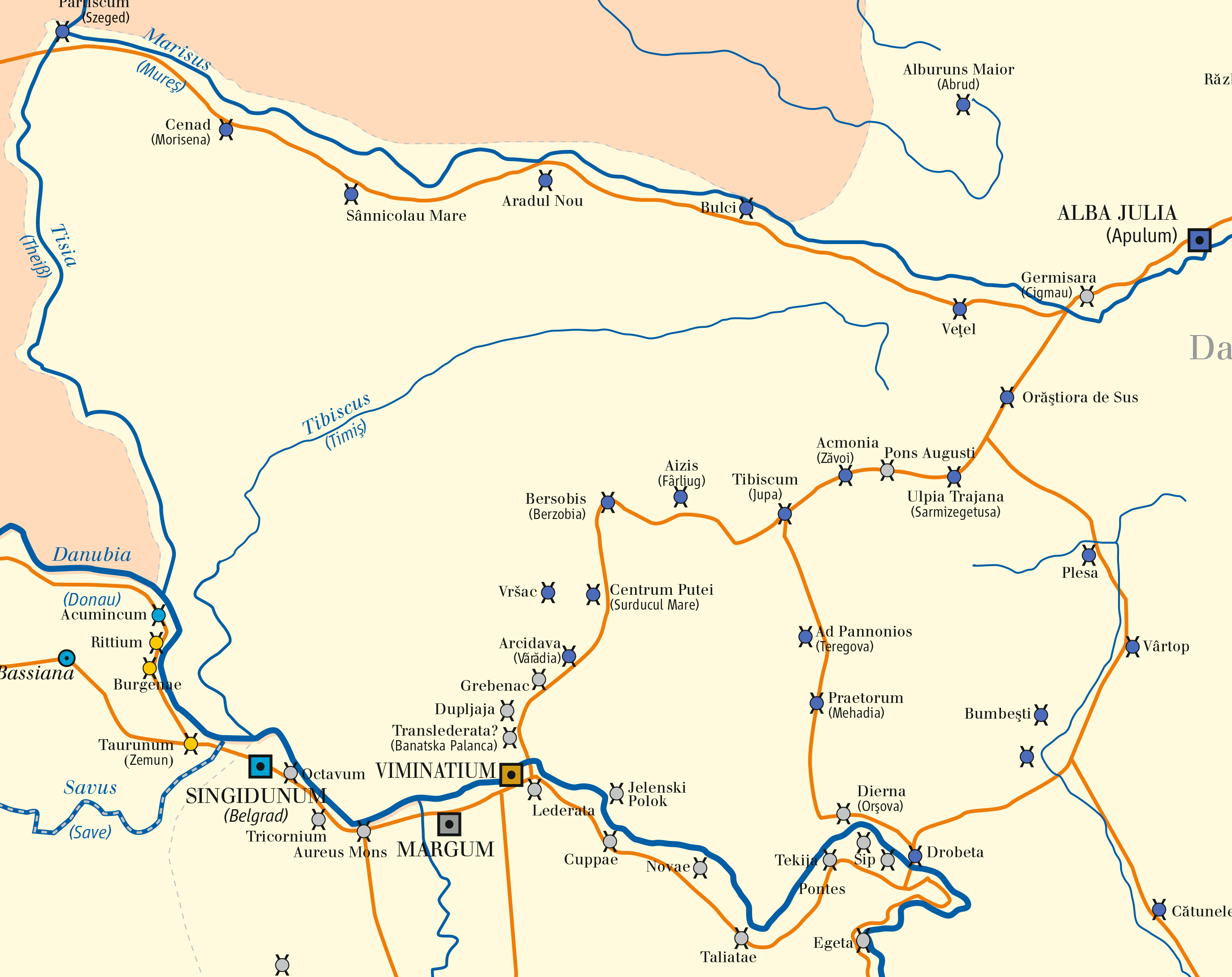
Western Dacia forts

== See also ==
- List of castra
