= Praetorium (castra of Mehadia) =

Praetorium (of Mehadia)
- Castra of Mehadia; Pretorio, Pretorich
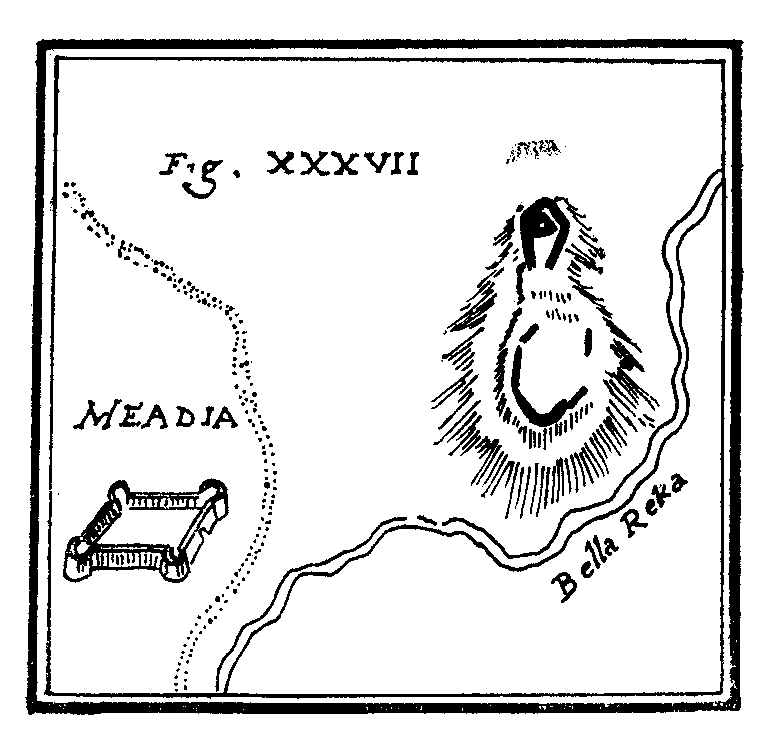

- Location within Romania
- 44.9229°N 22.3522°E
- Location: La zidine / Zidina, Mehadia, Caraș-Severin, Romania

History
- Founded: 2nd century AD

Site notes
- Elevation: 180 m (590 ft)
- Condition: Ruined

Praetorium was a fort in the Roman province of Dacia, located near Mehadia (Latin name Ad Mediam and/or Ad Medium), Romania.

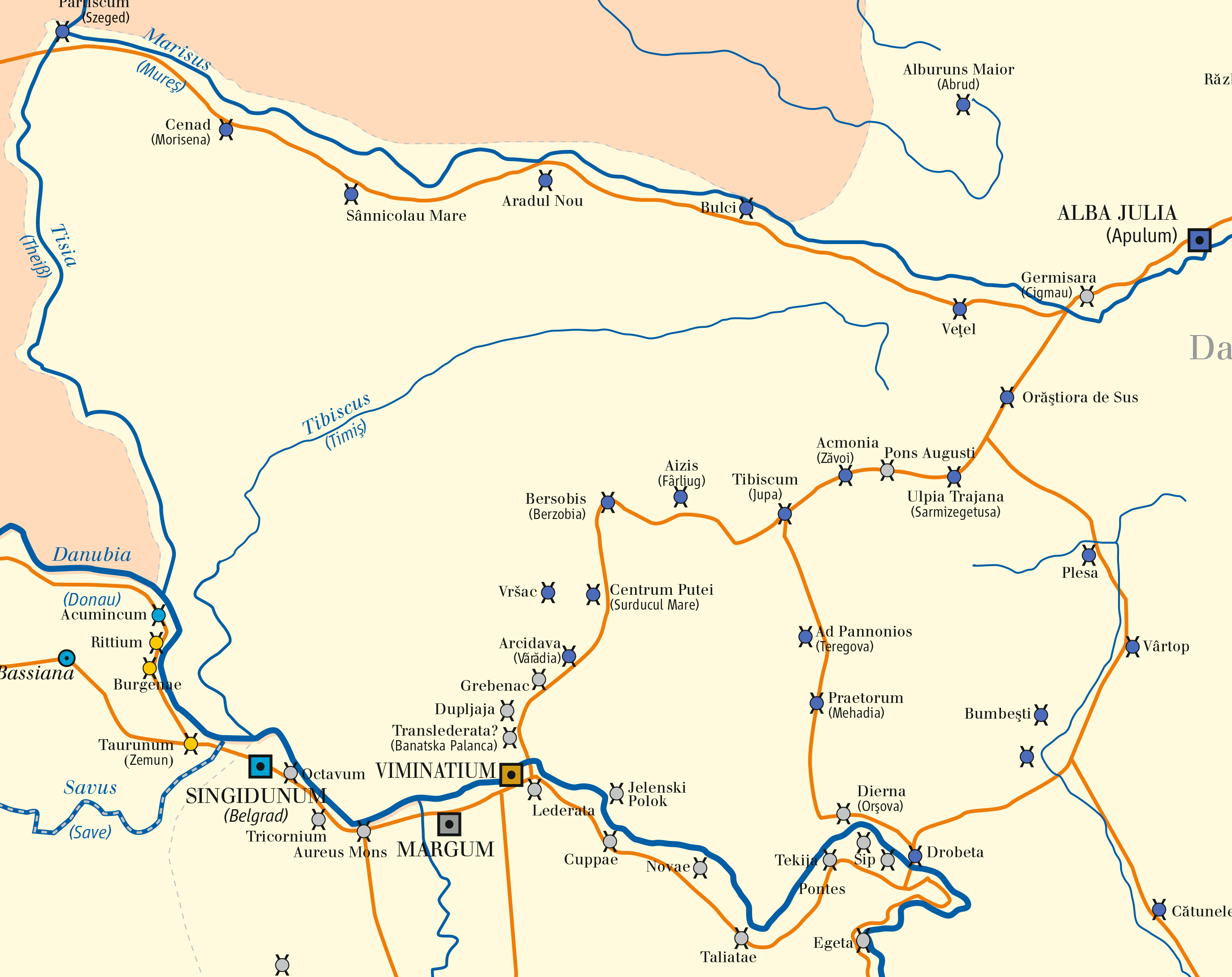
Western Dacia forts

== See also ==
- List of castra
