= Ulpianum (castra) =

Fort in the Roman province of Dacia

- Castra of Gilău
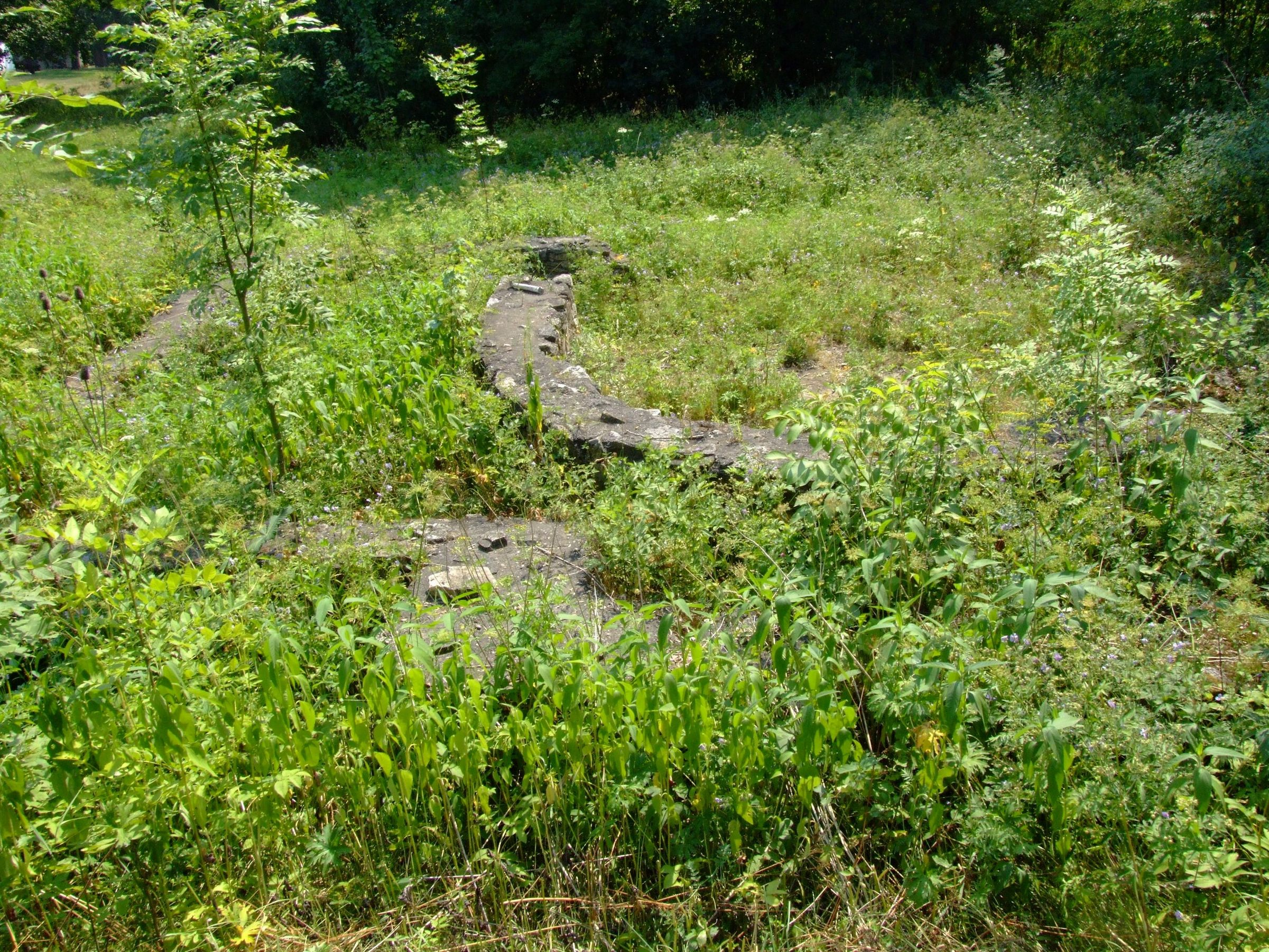
- Roman castra of Gilău, modern Romania

- Location within Romania
- 46.757343°N 23.380517°E
- Location: Gilău, Cluj, Romania

History
- Founded: 2nd century AD
- Built: Trajan
- Abandoned: 3rd century AD

Site notes
- Elevation: 530 m (1,740 ft)
- Condition: Ruined

Ulpianum was a fort in the Roman province of Dacia. Traces of the castra built in the 2nd century AD can be identified at the confluence of the rivers Someșul Mic and Căpuş in the Bánffy Castle's park at Gilău (Romania). A vicus developed south and west of the fort. A large building, 41x41m, within the fort is considered to have been either a valetudinarium or a fabrica.

The fort and its vicus were both abandoned in the 3rd century.

== History ==
The fort known three main phases of development:

1. After Trajan's Dacian Wars a wood and earth castra of 130x116m was built and garrisoned by Cohors I Pannonia veterana pia fidelis equitata.

2. The fort was enlarged during the reign of Hadrian and Ala Siliana replaced the former unit stationed.

3. The defences of the fort were rebuilt in stone and the internal plan was changed during a third phase, towards the end of the second century.

== See also ==
- List of castra
- Limes Porolissensis
