= Romula =

Ancient city in Roman Dacia

- Location within Romania
- 44.166667°N 24.4°E
- Location: Romania
- Region: Olt County

Romula or Malva was an ancient city in Roman Dacia, later the village of Reşca, Dobrosloveni Commune, Olt County, Romania. It was the capital of Dacia Malvensis, one of the three subdivisions of the province of Dacia.

== History ==
Romula (castra)
- Castra of Reșca
- Interactive map of Romula (castra)
- �44°10′N 24°24′E
- Location: Reşca, Olt, Romania

History
- Founded: 2nd century AD
- Built: Trajan
- Abandoned: c. 6th-7th century

Site notes
- Excavation dates: 1900
- Archaeologists: Pamfil Polonic
- Condition: Ruined

The Roman city of Romula lay on an earlier Dacian city called Malva. It received the title of municipium during the rule of Hadrian (117–138) and the title of colonia during that of Septimius Severus (193–211).

The city had two belts of fortifications and two castra, part of the Limes Alutanus frontier system and where soldiers of the Legiones VII Claudia and XXII Primigenia were temporarily stationed, alongside a permanent unit (numerus) of Syrian archers.

== See also ==
- Dacian davae
- List of ancient cities in Thrace and Dacia
- Dacia
- Roman Dacia
