= Resculum (castra) =

- * Castra of Bologa; Castra of Poieni; Rucconium
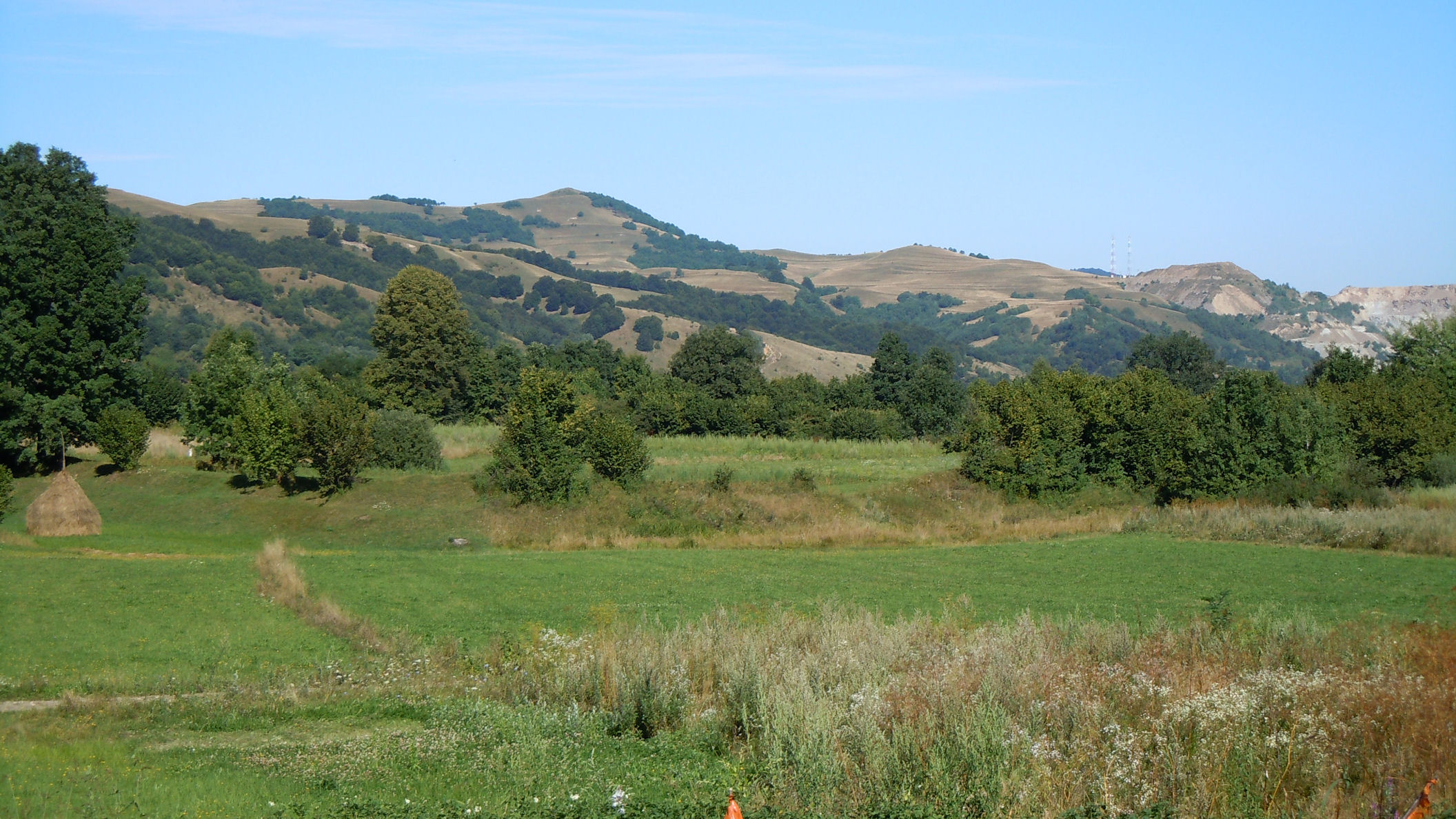
- View from South-East

- Location within Romania
- 46.885694°N 22.884611°E
- Location: Grădiște, Bologa, Cluj, Romania

History
- Founded: 2nd century AD
- Built: Trajan
- Abandoned: c. 4th-5th century AD

Site notes
- Elevation: 527 m (1,729 ft)
- Excavation dates: 1930; 1970; 2012-2013
- Archaeologists: Mihail Macrea; Nicolae Gudea; Felix Marcu; George Cupcea; Gelu Oloşutean; Cristian Filip; Imola Boda; Xenia Păuşa
- Condition: Ruined

Resculum or Rucconium was an ancient Roman fort in the Roman province of Dacia. The ruins are located near the village of Bologa, Cluj county, at the confluence of river Sebeș with river Criș, on the promontory of a hill. A vicus developed close to the castrum. An inscription cited by Károly Torma but now lost named the associated civil settlement as Anartorum.

It was the southwestern start point of Limes Porolissensis, from which a road led to Porolissum. An advanced outpost, 30km down the Crișul Repede valley, at Negreni, was connected to the fort.

== History ==
Three phases of the castra are known:

1. In the early phase, right after Trajan's Dacian Wars, the castrum was made of earth and timber. Initially Cohors I Ulpia Brittonum miliaria equitata was stationed there but it was later moved to Porolissum and replaced by Cohors II Hispanorum (renamed Cohors II Hispanorum scutata Cyrenaica equitata).

2. The fort was enlarged a couple of decades later as the presence of Cohors I Aelia Gaesatorum miliaria is also attested at the site.

3. At the beginning of the 3rd century it was rebuilt from stone and reached a size of 133.30 by 213 metres (437.3 ft × 698.8 ft). A horreum is attested at the site with a second, smaller logistic building of unknown function also present within the walls. It also manned numerous ancillary structures connected to it such as watchtowers and fortlets.

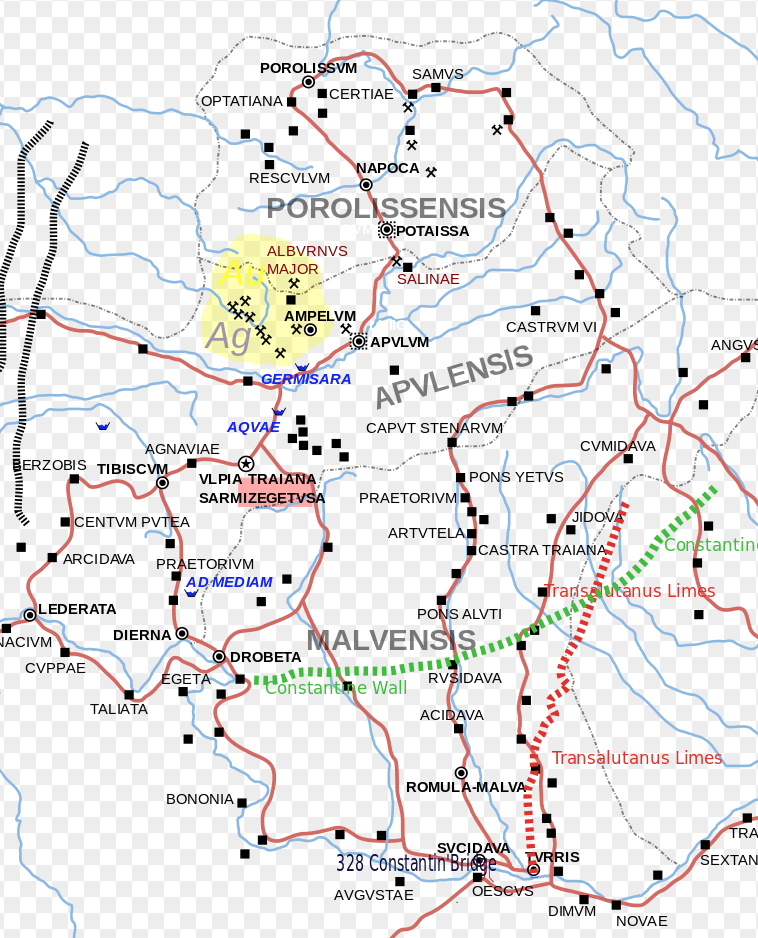
Western Dacia

== Gallery ==
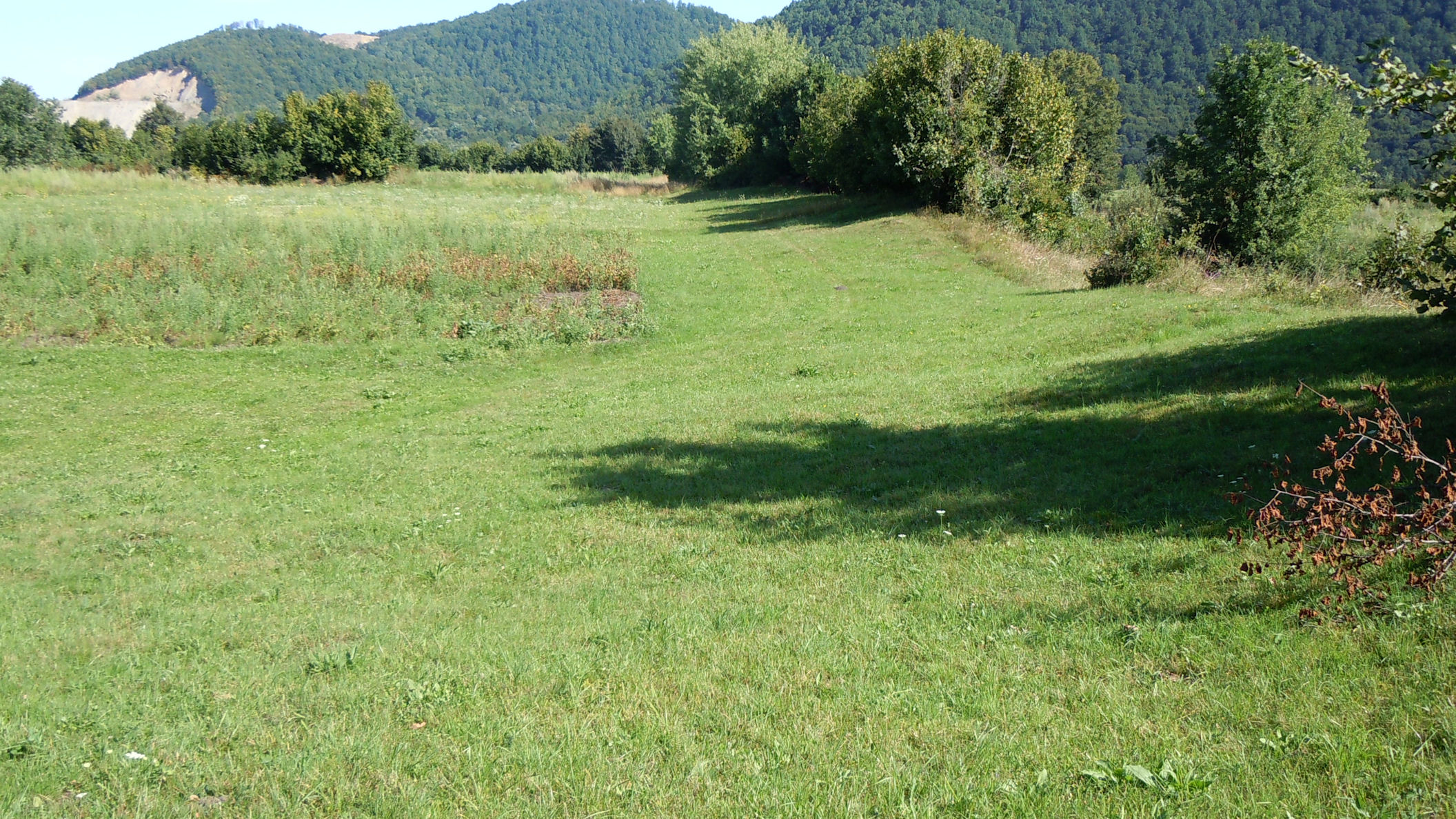

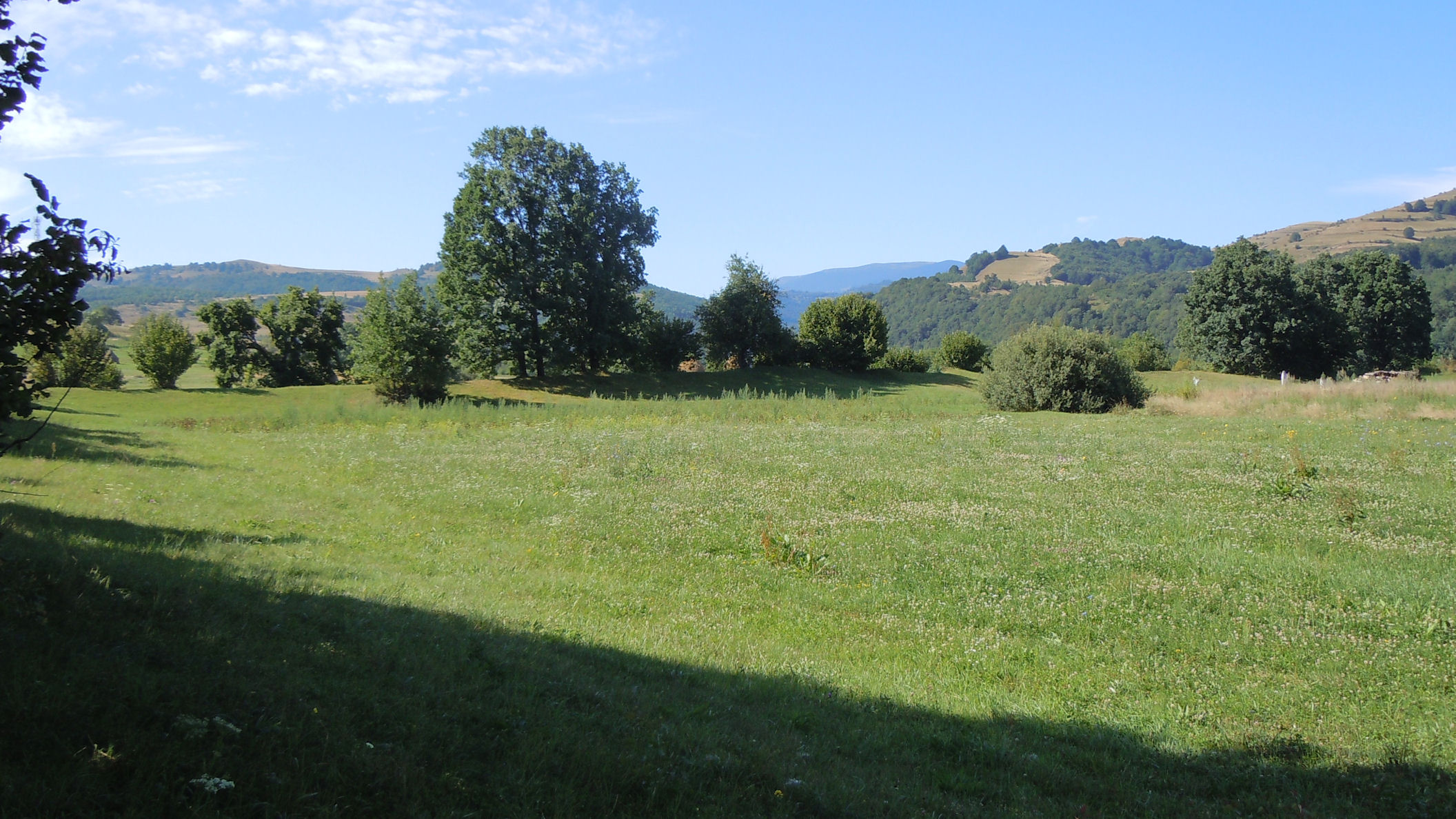

== See also ==
- List of castra

== Bibliography ==
- Gudea, Nicolae (1997). Das Römergrenzkastell von Bologa-Resculum. Castruł roman de la Bologa-Resculum [The Roman Frontier Fort of Bologa-Resculum]. Führer zu archäologischen Denkmälern in Dacia Porolissensis / Ghid al monumentelor arheologice din Dacia Porolissensis, vol. 1. Zalau.
