= Napoca (castra) =

- Napuca, Napuka
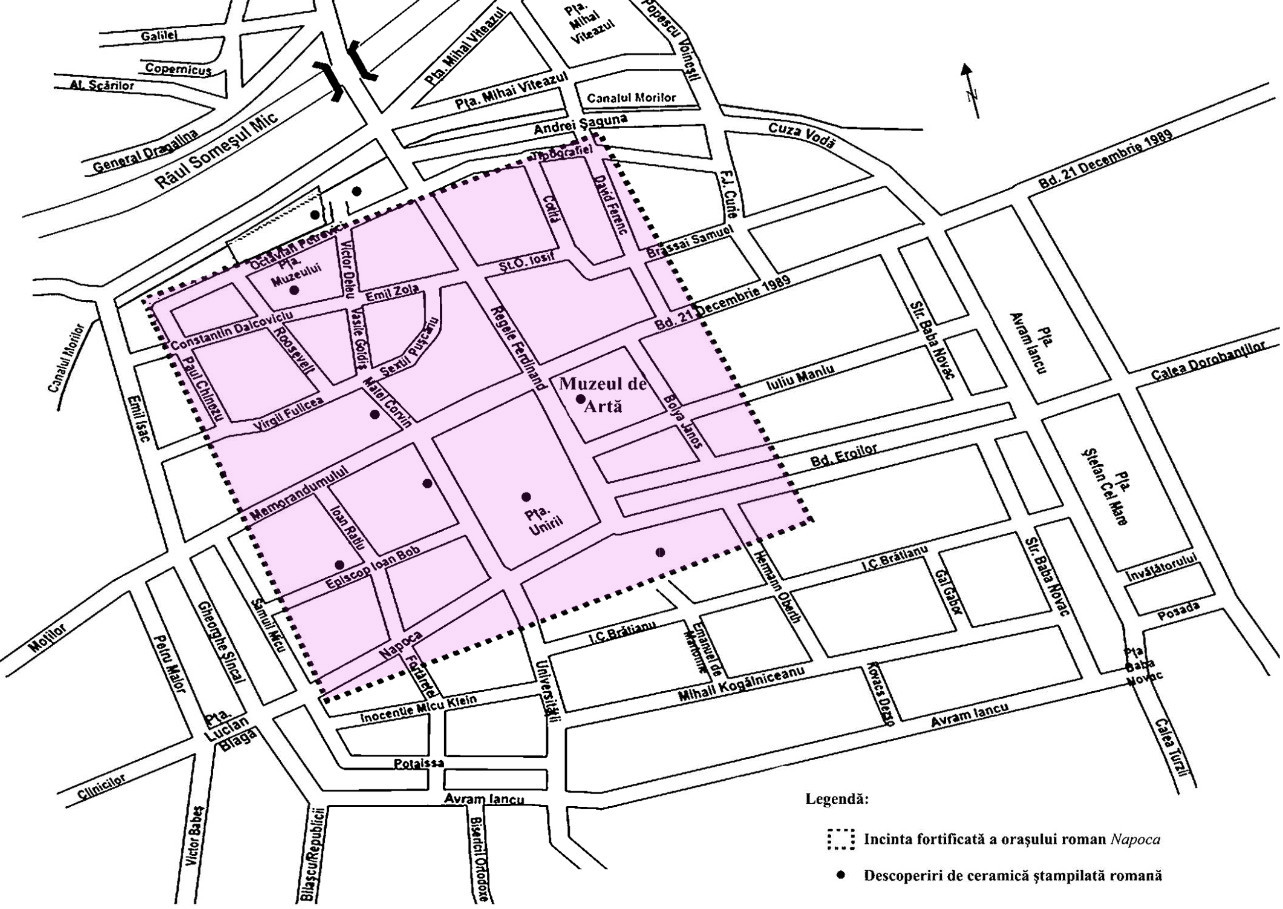
- The fort of Napoca

- Location within Romania
- 46.770353°N 23.588954°E
- Location: Cluj-Napoca, Cluj, Romania

History
- Founded: 2nd century AD
- Built: Trajan ?

Site notes
- Elevation: 346 m (1,135 ft)
- Condition: Ruined

Napoca was a Roman castra (fort) in the province of Dacia.

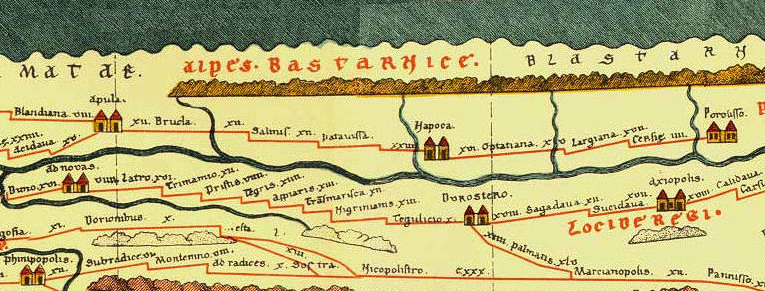
Napoca in Tabula Peutingeriana

== See also ==
- List of castra
