= List of Roman military units that participated in the Marcomannic Wars =

This page lists all Roman military units that participated in the Marcomannic Wars. There were thirteen legions, two vexillationes, fifty nine auxiliary units and one naval unit.

Unit	Type/notes
Legio I Adiutrix	Legion
Legio II Adiutrix	Legion
Legio VII Claudia	Legion
Legio XI Claudia	Legion
Legio IV Flavia Felix	Legion
Legio X Gemina	Legion
Legio XIII Gemina	Legion
Legio I Italica	Legion
Legio II Italica	Legion
Legio III Italica	Legion
Legio V Macedonica	Legion
Legio XXII Primigenia	Legion
?	Legion
Vexillatio of Legio III Augusta	Vexillatio
Vexillatio of Legio XII Fulminata	Vexillatio
Cohors Hispanorum Aravacorum	Auxilia, deployed in Pannonia Inferior, Pannonia Superior and Noricum
Cohors I Aelia milliaria sagittaria equitata	Auxilia, deployed in Pannonia Inferior, Pannonia Superior and Noricum
Ala I Ulpia contariorum milliaria	Auxilia, deployed in Pannonia Inferior, Pannonia Superior and Noricum
Ala III Augusta Thracum sagittaria	Auxilia, deployed in Pannonia Inferior, Pannonia Superior and Noricum
Cohors IV voluntariorum	Auxilia, deployed in Pannonia Inferior, Pannonia Superior and Noricum
Cohors I Thracum civium Romanorum	Auxilia, deployed in Pannonia Inferior, Pannonia Superior and Noricum
Ala I Cannanefatium	Auxilia, deployed in Pannonia Inferior, Pannonia Superior and Noricum
Cohors I Thracum equitata	Auxilia, deployed in Pannonia Inferior, Pannonia Superior and Noricum
Cohors XIIX voluntariorum	Auxilia, deployed in Pannonia Inferior, Pannonia Superior and Noricum
Ala I Thracum veterana sagittaria	Auxilia, deployed in Pannonia Inferior, Pannonia Superior and Noricum
Ala I civium Romanorum	Auxilia, deployed in Pannonia Inferior, Pannonia Superior and Noricum
Cohors I Thracum Germanica equitata	Auxilia, deployed in Pannonia Inferior, Pannonia Superior and Noricum
Cohors I Alpinorum peditata	Auxilia, deployed in Pannonia Inferior, Pannonia Superior and Noricum
Cohors I Alpinorum equitata	Auxilia, deployed in Pannonia Inferior, Pannonia Superior and Noricum
Cohors II Alpinorum equitata	Auxilia, deployed in Pannonia Inferior, Pannonia Superior and Noricum
Ala I Aravacorum	Auxilia, deployed in Pannonia Inferior, Pannonia Superior and Noricum
Ala I Brittonum civium Romanorum	Auxilia, deployed in Pannonia Inferior, Pannonia Superior and Noricum
Cohors I Noricorum equitata	Auxilia, deployed in Pannonia Inferior, Pannonia Superior and Noricum
Cohors I Lusitanorum	Auxilia, deployed in Pannonia Inferior, Pannonia Superior and Noricum
Cohors III Lusitanorum pia fidelis	Auxilia, deployed in Pannonia Inferior, Pannonia Superior and Noricum
Cohors VII Breucorum equitata	Auxilia, deployed in Pannonia Inferior, Pannonia Superior and Noricum
Cohors I Montanorum civium Romanorum	Auxilia, deployed in Pannonia Inferior, Pannonia Superior and Noricum
Cohors V Breucorum	Auxilia, deployed in Pannonia Inferior, Pannonia Superior and Noricum
Cohors I Campanorum voluntariorum	Auxilia, deployed in Pannonia Inferior, Pannonia Superior and Noricum
Cohors III Batavorum milliaria equitata	Auxilia, deployed in Pannonia Inferior, Pannonia Superior and Noricum
Cohors II Aurelia Dacorum milliaria equitata	Auxilia, deployed in Pannonia Inferior, Pannonia Superior and Noricum
Ala I Augusta Ituraeorum sagittaria	Auxilia, deployed in Pannonia Inferior, Pannonia Superior and Noricum
Ala I praetoria	Auxilia, deployed in Pannonia Inferior, Pannonia Superior and Noricum
Cohors I milliaria Maurorum equitata	Auxilia, deployed in Pannonia Inferior, Pannonia Superior and Noricum
Cohors I milliaria Numidarum	Auxilia, deployed in Pannonia Inferior, Pannonia Superior and Noricum
Cohors II Asturum et Callaecorum	Auxilia, deployed in Pannonia Inferior, Pannonia Superior and Noricum
Cohors I Aurelia Antonina milliaria Hemesenorum sagittaria	Auxilia, deployed in Pannonia Inferior, Pannonia Superior and Noricum
Classis Flavia Pannonica	Navy, deployed in Pannonia Inferior, Pannonia Superior and Noricum
Numeri	Auxilia, deployed in Pannonia Inferior, Pannonia Superior and Noricum
Ala I Claudia nova miscellanea	Auxilia, deployed in Dacia and both Moesias
Cohors I Antiochensium	Auxilia, deployed in Dacia and both Moesias
Cohors I Bracarorum civium Romanorum	Auxilia, deployed in Dacia and both Moesias
Cohors I Britannica milliaria civium Romanorum equitata	Auxilia, deployed in Dacia and both Moesias
Cohors I Ulpia Brittonum milliaria	Auxilia, deployed in Dacia and both Moesias
Cohors II Brittanorum milliaria civium Romanorum pia fidelis	Auxilia, deployed in Dacia and both Moesias
Ala Gallorum Flaviana	Auxilia, deployed in Dacia and both Moesias
Ala I Vespasiana Dardanorum	Auxilia, deployed in Dacia and both Moesias
Cohors II Flavia Brittonum	Auxilia, deployed in Dacia and both Moesias
Cohors III Brittonum veterana equitata	Auxilia, deployed in Dacia and both Moesias
Cohors I Cannanefatium	Auxilia, deployed in Dacia and both Moesias
Cohors I Cilicum milliaria equitata sagittaria	Auxilia, deployed in Dacia and both Moesias
Cohors I Cispadanensium	Auxilia, deployed in Dacia and both Moesias
Cohors I Flavia Commagenarum	Auxilia, deployed in Dacia and both Moesias
Cohors II Flavia Commagenarum	Auxilia, deployed in Dacia and both Moesias
Ala I Flavia Gaetulorum	Auxilia, deployed in Dacia and both Moesias
Ala Gallorum Atectorigiana	Auxilia, deployed in Dacia and both Moesias
Ala Gallorum et Pannoniorum	Auxilia, deployed in Dacia and both Moesias
Cohors I Aurelia Dardanorum equitata	Auxilia, deployed in Dacia and both Moesias
Cohors I Aelia Gaesatorum milliaria	Auxilia, deployed in Dacia and both Moesias
Cohors II Gallorum	Auxilia, deployed in Dacia and both Moesias
Cohors III Gallorum	Auxilia, deployed in Dacia and both Moesias
Cohors I sagittariorum	Auxilia, deployed in Dacia and both Moesias
Cohors I Thracum Syriaca	Auxilia, deployed in Dacia and both Moesias
Ala II Hispanorum et Aravacorum	Auxilia, deployed in Dacia and both Moesias
Ala Siliana	Auxilia, deployed in Dacia and both Moesias
