= Cohors I Alpinorum =

Cohors I Alpinorum may refer to:

- Cohors I Alpinorum equitata
- Cohors I Alpinorum peditata
