= Ala Afrorum =

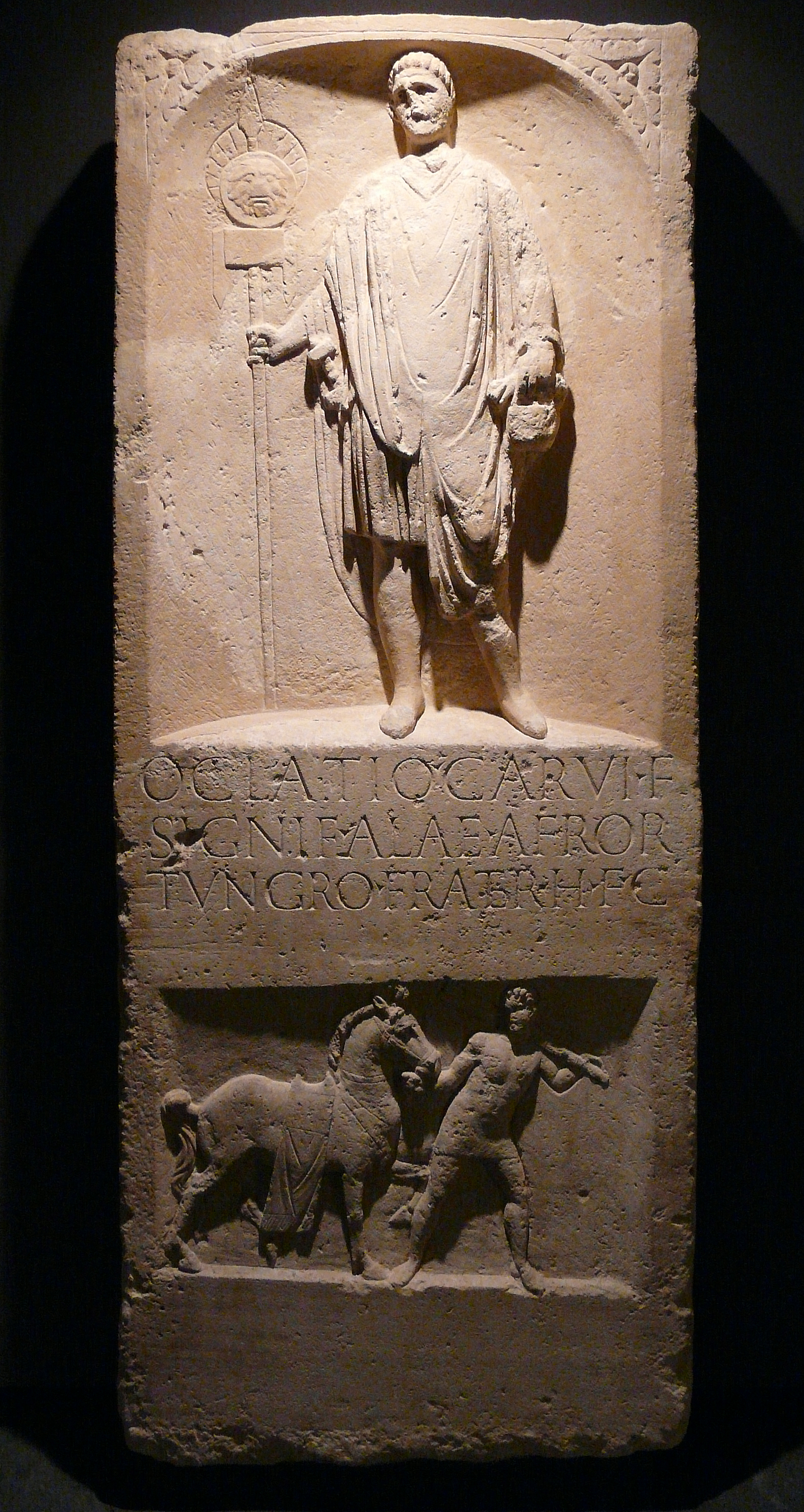
Funeral inscription from Novaesium (Neuss, Germany) of Oclatius Carvi filius, a signifer of the Ala Afrorum

The Ala Afrorum, or Ala Afrorum Veterana, was a Roman cavalry unit founded in Africa Proconsularis. The unit formed an ala quinquagenaria, with a total of about 500 cavalrymen. In the first half of the 1st century AD the unit moved from this area to Europe, and was based in Moesia. At the time of the Batavian rebellion (69–70 AD) the unit was sent to the present Dutch part of Germania Inferior to support the Roman troops.

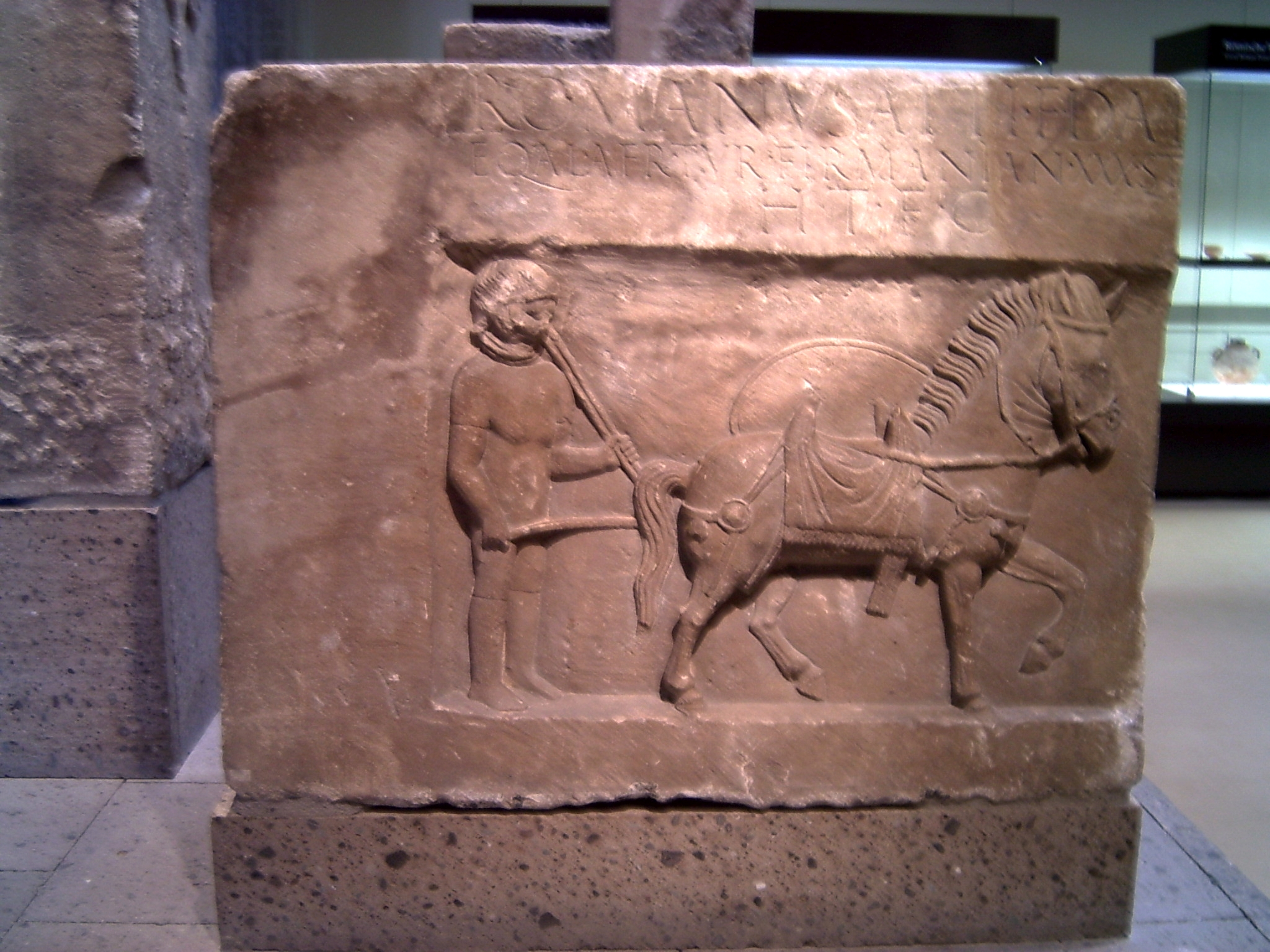
Funeral inscription from Cologne (Germany) depicting a cavalryman of the Ala Afrorum named Romanus Daradanus

Till at least 158 AD the unit stayed stationed in Burginatum (present-day Kalkar, Germany), with the exception of the period 88/89 to 98 AD, when the unit fought against the Dacians under the command of Domitian. By doing so they missed the title Pia Fidelis ("dutiful and loyal") that was given to all units in Germania Inferior in 89 AD.

Under the reign of Trajan a second Ala Afrorum was formed in Egypt: Ala II Ulpia Alfrorum. This unit did not have any relationship with the Ala Afrorum Veterana.

== See also ==
- Roman auxiliaries
- List of Roman auxiliary regiments
