= Cohors V Delmatarum =

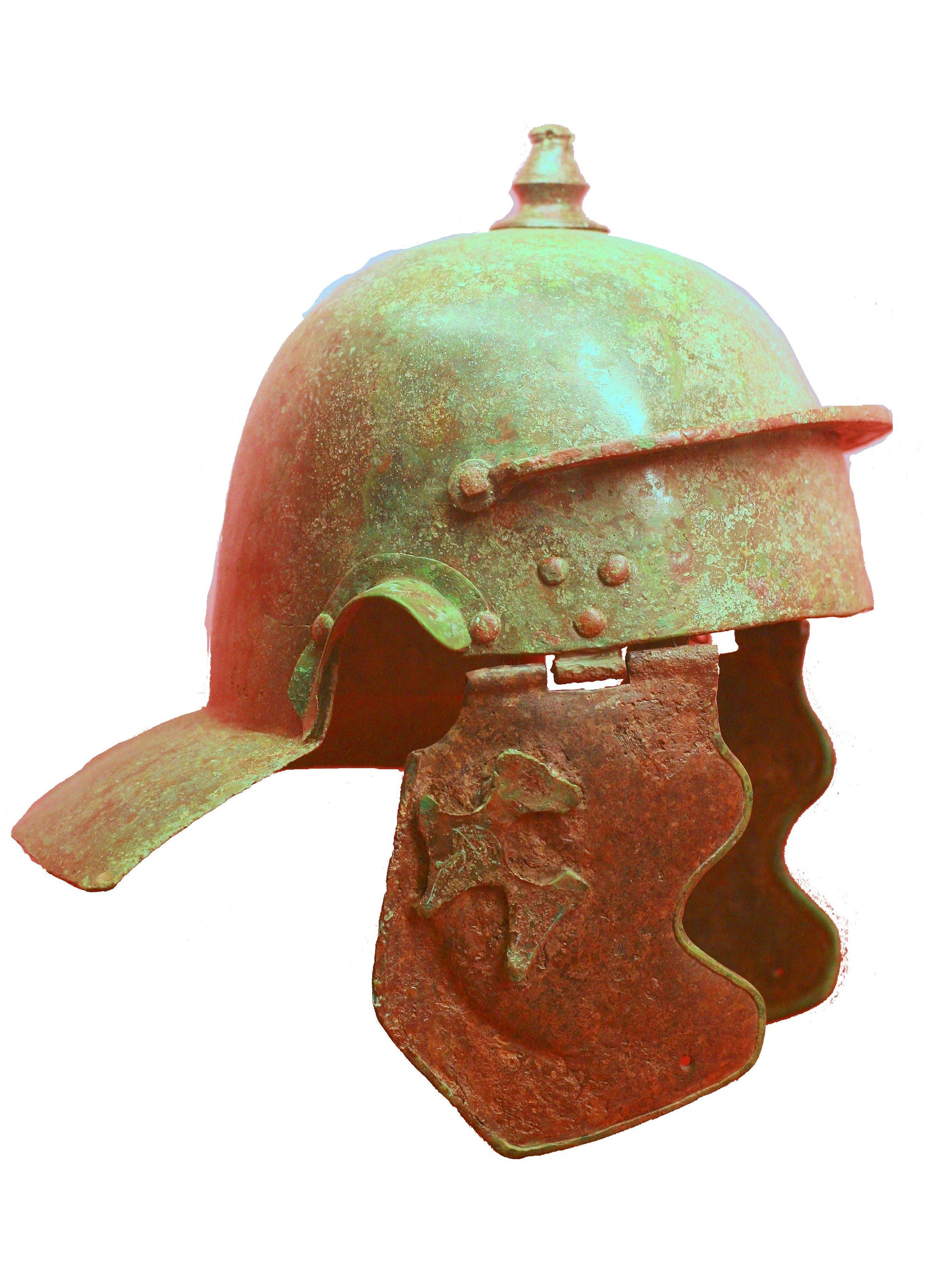
- Roman infantry helmet (late 1st century)
- Active: early 1st century to at least late 2nd century
- Country: Roman Empire
- Type: Roman auxiliary cohort
- Role: infantry
- Size: 480 men
- Garrison/HQ: Germania Superior 74–185

Cohors quinta Delmatarum ("5th Cohort of Dalmatae") was a Roman auxiliary infantry unit. It is named after the Dalmatae, an Illyrian-speaking tribe that inhabited the Adriatic coastal mountain range of the eponymous Dalmatia. The ancient geographer Strabo describes these mountains as extremely rugged, and the Dalmatae as backward and warlike. He claims that they did not use money long after their neighbours adopted it and that they "made war on the Romans for a long time". He also criticises the Dalmatae, a nation of pastoralists, for turning fertile plains into sheep pasture. Indeed, the name of the tribe itself is believed to mean "shepherds", derived from the Illyrian word delme ("sheep"). The final time this people fought against Rome was in the Illyrian revolt of 6–9 AD. The revolt was started by Dalmatae auxiliary forces and soon spread all over Dalmatia and Pannonia. The resulting war was described by the Roman writer Suetonius as the most difficult faced by Rome since the Punic Wars two centuries earlier. But after the war, the Dalmatae became a loyal and important source of recruits for the Roman army.

According to Holder, a total of 12 cohortes Delmatarum appear to have been raised after the suppression of the Illyrian revolt in two series, of 7 and 5 respectively. All these units were in existence by the time of emperor Claudius (r. 41-54) Of these, 9 appear to have survived into the 2nd century.

The regiment was probably raised by founder-emperor Augustus (r. 30BC-14AD) after 9 AD. It was certainly in existence by the time of Claudius (r. 41-54). It is unclear why two cohortes Delmatarum were given the same number V: this regiment and cohors V Delmatarum c.R. in Mauretania Tingitana). Spaul suggests the regiment in Mauretania may be the cohors I Liburnorum renamed. The regiment first appears in the datable epigraphic record in 74 AD in Germania (prob. Superior). It was still in Germania Superior in 185, the time of its last datable inscription. The regiment's tile stamp has been found at the Roman fort of Böckingen and epitaphs at Arnsburg, Moguntiacum and Wiesbaden.

The names of 1 praefectus (regimental commander) and 2 centuriones (infantry officers) are preserved, without origins. The names of 3 caligati (common soldiers) are also preserved, two of whom were Illyrians.

== See also ==
- List of Roman auxiliary regiments
