= Cohors I Hispanorum =

Cohors I Hispanorum may refer to:

- Cohors I Flavia Ulpia Hispanorum milliaria equitata civium Romanorum
- Cohors I Hispanorum [quingenaria peditata] pia fidelis
