= Cohors I Cypria c.R. =

Cohors I Cypria quingenaria peditata civium Romanorum
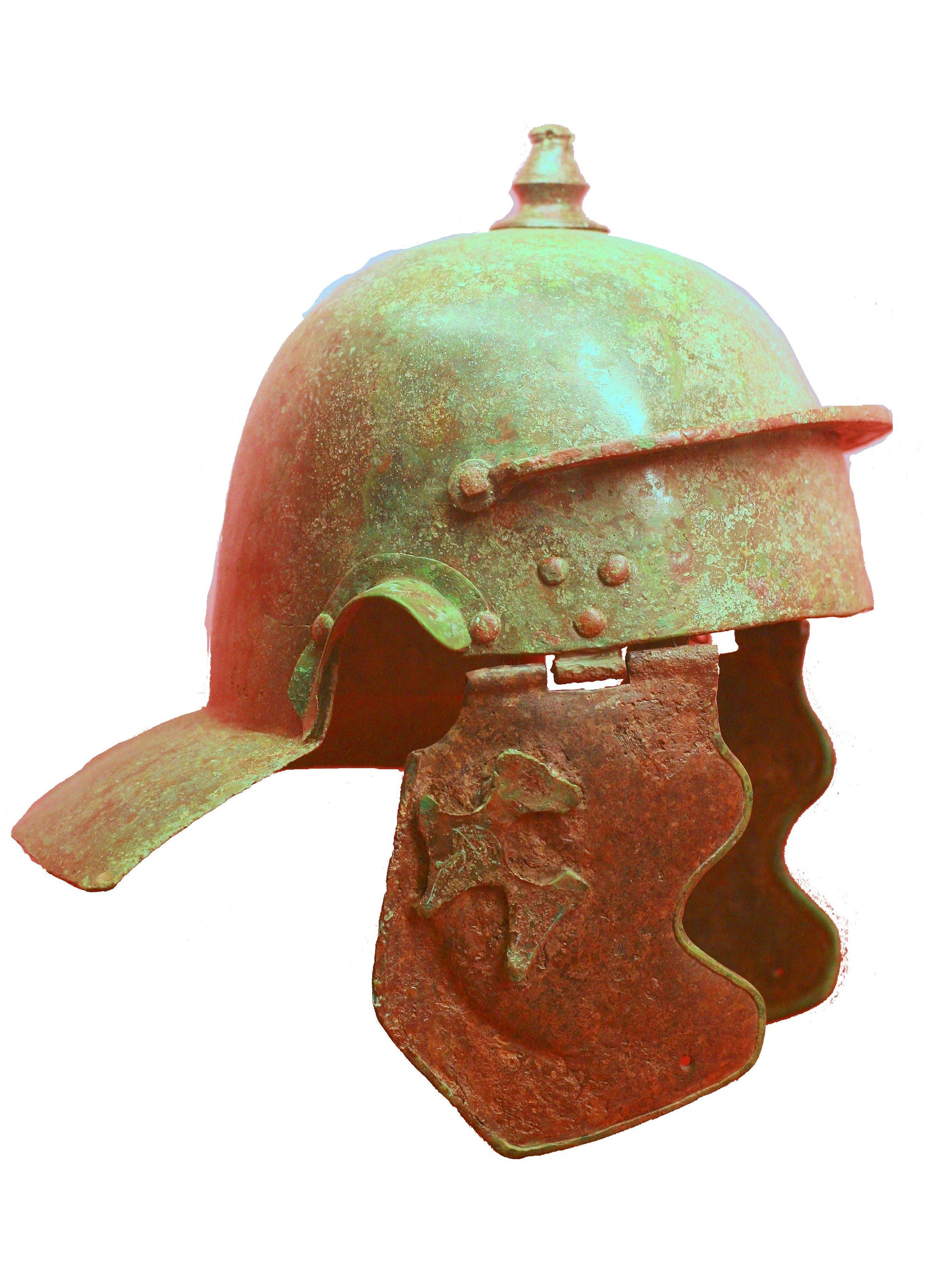
- Roman infantry helmet (late 1st century)
- Active: ?
- Country: Roman Empire
- Type: Roman auxiliary cohort
- Role: infantry
- Size: 480 men (480 infantry)

Cohors [prima] Cananefatium [quingenaria peditata] civium Romanorum ("[1st infantry 500 strong] cohort of Roman citizens Cyprii") was a Roman auxiliary infantry regiment. The cohort stationed in Dacia at castra of Bumbești-Jiu (Gară) and Vârtop).

== See also ==
- List of Roman auxiliary regiments
