= Cohors I Ulpia Galatarum =

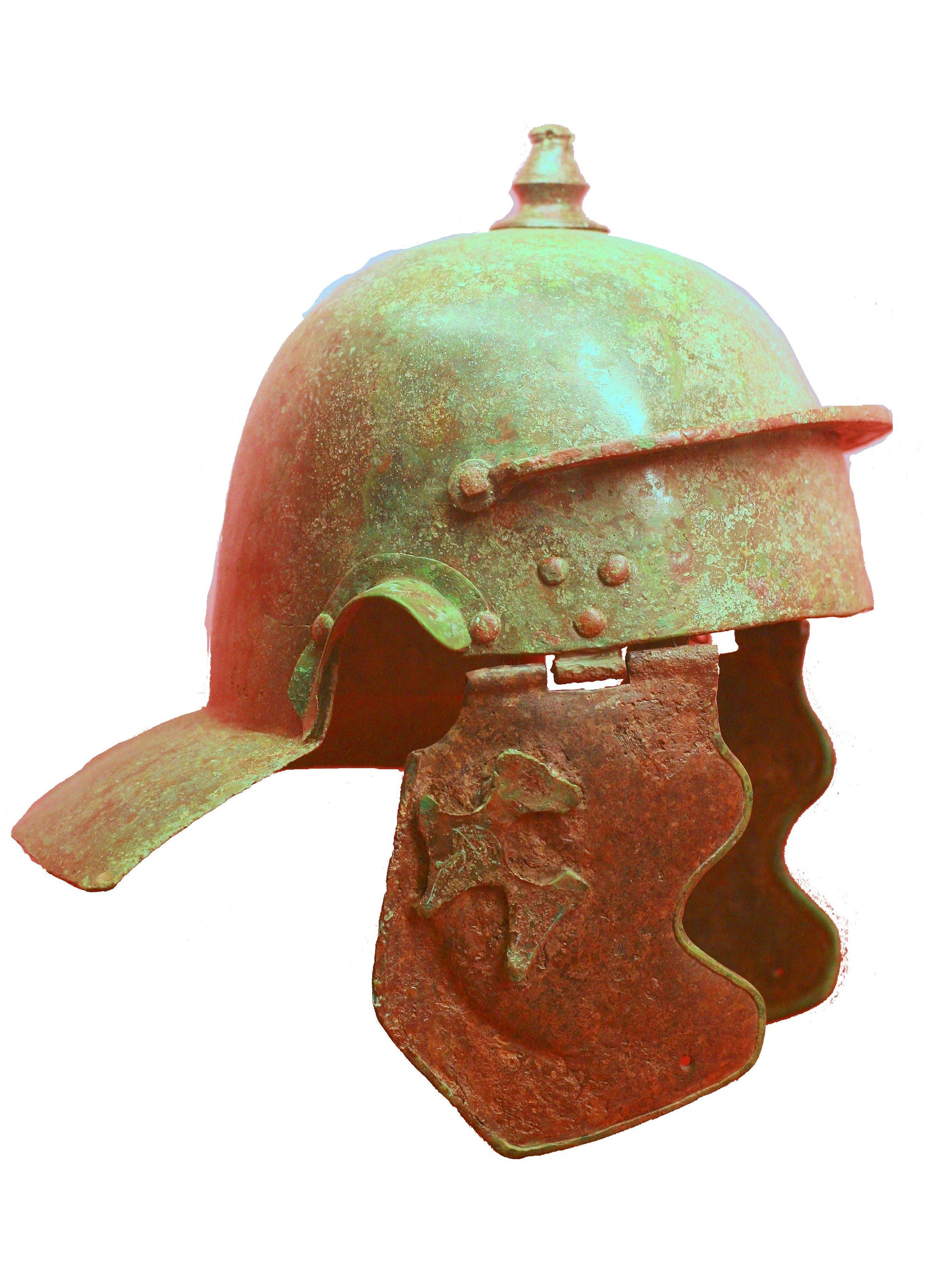
- Roman infantry helmet (late 1st century)
- Active: ?
- Country: Roman Empire
- Type: Roman auxiliary cohort
- Role: infantry
- Size: 480 infantry

Cohors prima Ulpia Galatarum ("1st Ulpian cohort of Galatians") was a Roman auxiliary cohort of infantry.

== Name ==
- Ulpia: Ulpian. The Imperial family name shows a link to the emperor Trajan (Marcus Ulpius Traianus).
- Galatarum: Galatians. At the time the unit was raised, the recruits came from the Roman province of Galatia.

Since there is no indication for milliaria and equitata, the unit was a Cohors quingenaria peditata with a nominal strength of 480 infantry (6 centuriae with 80 men each).

== History ==
The unit was probably raised by Trajan in preparation for his Parthian campaign around 112/113. It is attested on military diplomas for the province of Syria Palaestina issued in 136/137, 139, 142, 149/160, 158, 160 and 186. In 238 it was at Aquileia in Italy, presumably as part of the exercitus Aquilensis.

== Garrisons ==
Possible garrisons were:

- Aquileia: (AE 1934, 230)

== Attested personnel ==
The following personnel is attested on inscriptions:

=== Commanders ===
All commanders were prefects.

- Flavius Adiutor (AE 1934, 230)
- M. Ulpius Tryphon Megas Antoninianus
- T. Statilius Frontonianus

== See also ==
- Roman auxiliaries
- List of Roman auxiliary regiments
