= Cohors I Flavia Canathenorum =

Roman military unit

Cohors I Flavia Canathenorum [sagittaria] [milliaria]
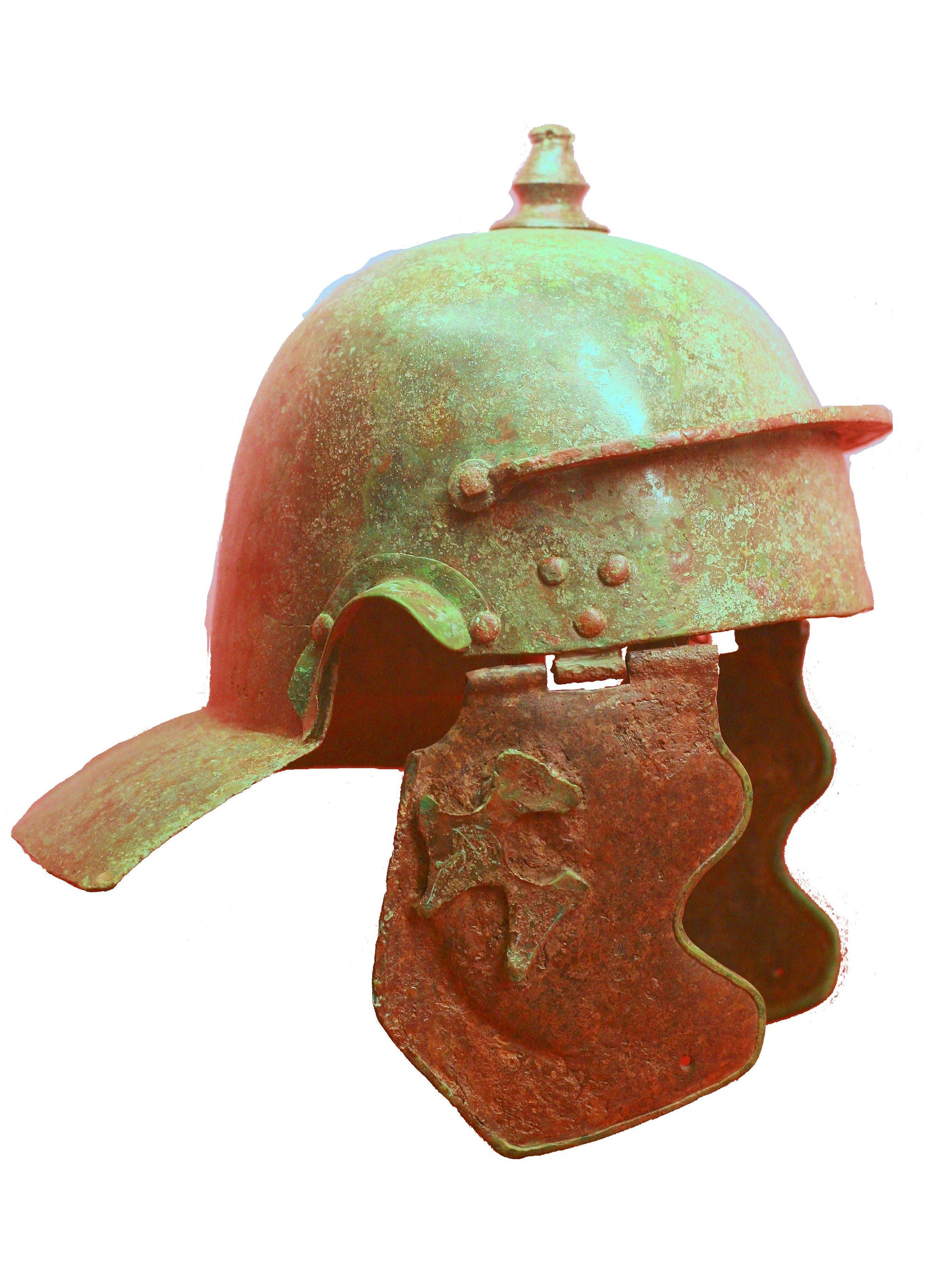
- Roman infantry helmet (late 1st century)
- Active: ?
- Country: Roman Empire
- Type: Roman auxiliary cohort
- Role: infantry
- Size: 800 infantry

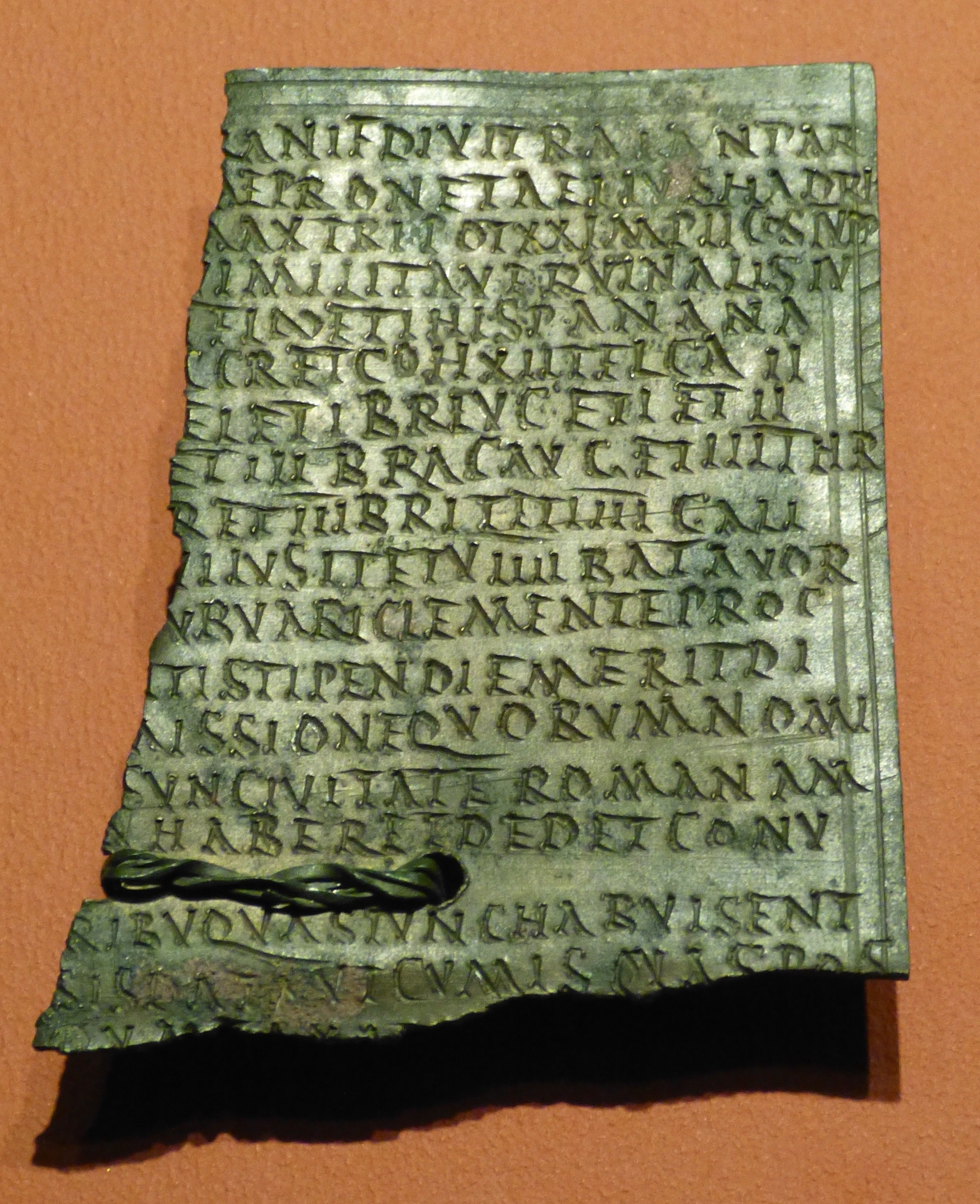
The military diploma of 156/157 (CIL XVI, 183)

Cohors prima Flavia Canathenorum [sagittaria] [milliaria] ("1st Flavian cohort of Canathaens, archers, 1000 strong") was a Roman auxiliary cohort of infantry.

== Name ==
- Flavia: Flavian. The Imperial family name shows a link to the emperors Vespasian, Titus or Domitian. The unit was probably raised during the reign of Vespasian.
- Canathenorum: Canathans. At the time the unit was raised, the recruits came from the city of Canatha and the nearby area.
- sagittariorum or sagittaria: Archers.
- milliaria: 1000 strong. A Cohors milliaria peditata had a nominal strength of 800, a Cohors milliaria equitata of 1040. On the military diplomas the sign $\infty$ is used instead of milliaria.

Since there is no indication for equitata, the unit was a Cohors milliaria peditata (infantry unit) with a nominal strength of 800 men.

== Military diplomas ==
The unit is attested on military diplomas for the province of Raetia issued in 116, 116/121, 125/128, 139, 151/170, 154/161, 156, 157, 157/161, 159/160, 160, 162, 166 and 167/168.

== Garrisons ==
Possible garrisons in Raetia were:

- Eining
- Kösching
- Regensburg-Kumpfmühl
- Sorviodurum (Straubing): The unit was stationed here in the 2nd and 3rd century.

Tiles with the stamp C I F C were found in Eining and Kösching, tiles with the stamp COH I CAN in Regensburg-Kumpfmühl and Sorviodurum (CIL III, 11992).

== Attested personnel ==
The following personnel is attested on diplomas or inscriptions:

=== Commanders ===
- Aelius [.] (ca. 162): he is listed on the military diploma (CIL XVI, 118)
- M. Plotius Faustus (CIL VIII, 2394, CIL VIII, 2395, CIL VIII, 17904)

=== Soldiers ===
- Asuodane, a soldier: the diploma (CIL XVI, 118) was issued for him.

== See also ==
- Roman auxiliaries
- List of Roman auxiliary regiments
