= Cohors II Aquitanorum equitata c.R. =

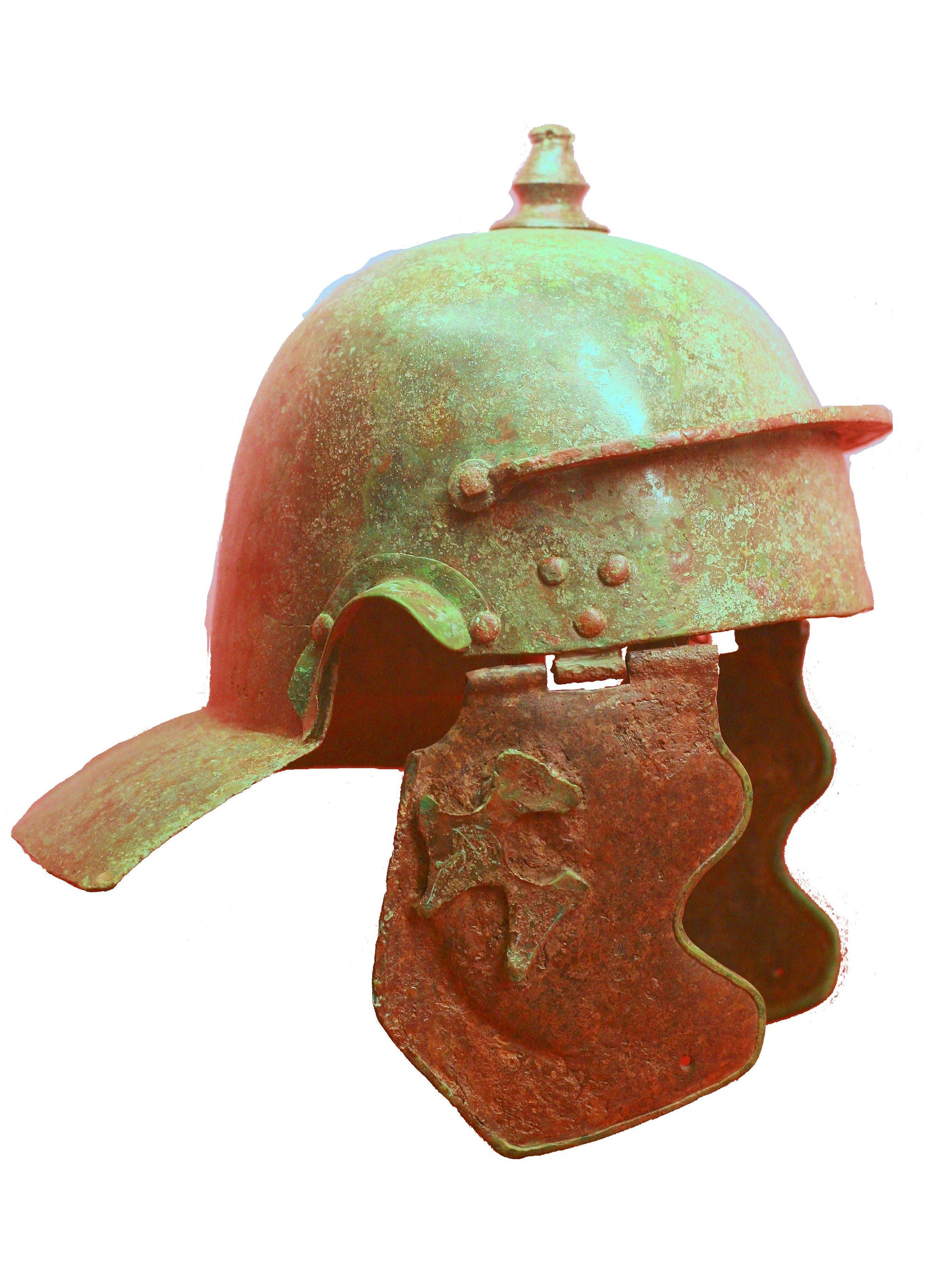
- Roman infantry helmet (late 1st century)
- Active: early 1st century to at least 166
- Country: Roman Empire
- Type: Roman auxiliary cohort
- Role: infantry/cavalry
- Size: 600 men (480 infantry, 120 cavalry)
- Garrison/HQ: Germania Superior 82-90; Raetia 116-66

Cohors secunda Aquitanorum equitata civium Romanorum ("2nd part-mounted Cohort of Aquitani Roman citizens") was a Roman auxiliary mixed infantry and cavalry regiment. It was probably originally raised in Gallia Aquitania in the reign of founder-emperor Augustus after the revolt of the Aquitani was suppressed in 26 BC. Unlike most Gauls, the Aquitani were not Celtic-speaking but spoke Aquitanian, a now extinct non Indo-European language closely related to Basque. The regiment was also known as cohors II Biturigum. The Bituriges were a Celtic-speaking tribe whose territory was included in Gallia Aquitania. It is believed that when the Aquitani regiments were originally raised (probably in two series), some were made up of mixed Aquitani and Bituriges recruits.

The regiment was probably stationed on the Rhine frontier from an early stage. It first appears in the datable epigraphic record in Germania Superior (Pfalz/Alsace) in 82 AD. Not later than 116 it was transferred to Raetia (Germany S of Danube). It was still in Raetia on its last attested date, 166. There is no certain information as to which forts it occupied in Raetia.

The origins of the three attested personnel are unknown. The honorific title civium Romanorum (c.R. for short) first appears in the record in 116. It was normally awarded by the emperor for valour to an auxiliary regiment as a whole. The award would include the grant of Roman citizenship to all the regiment's men, but not to subsequent recruits to the regiment. The regiment, however, would retain the prestigious title in perpetuity.

Until 212, only a minority of the empire's inhabitants (inc. all Italians) held full Roman citizenship. The rest were denoted peregrini, a second-class status. Since the legions admitted only citizens, peregrini could only enlist in the auxilia. Citizenship carried a number of tax and other privileges and was highly sought after. It could also be earned by serving the minimum 25-year term in the auxilia.

== See also ==
- List of Roman auxiliary regiments
