= Cohors III Ulpia Petraeorum =

Cohors III Ulpia Petraeorum [sagittaria] [milliaria] [equitata]
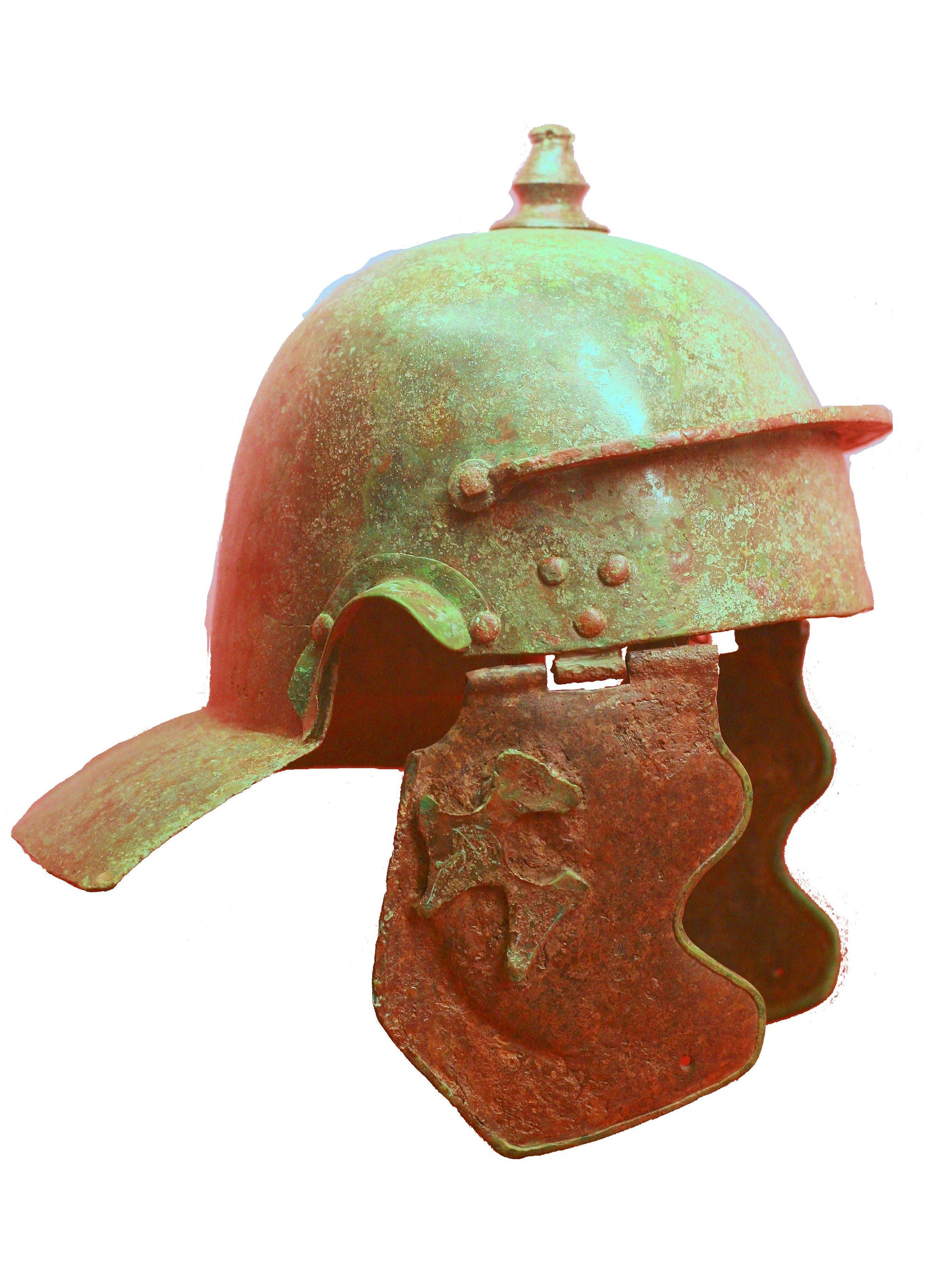
- Roman infantry helmet (late 1st century)
- Active: ?
- Country: Roman Empire
- Type: Roman auxiliary cohort
- Role: infantry
- Size: 800 infantry, 240 cavalry

Cohors tertia Ulpia Petraeorum [sagittaria] [milliaria] [equitata] ("3rd Ulpian cohort from Petra, archers, 1000 strong, part-mounted") was a Roman auxiliary cohort of infantry and cavalry.

== Name ==
- Ulpia: Ulpian. The Imperial family name shows a link to the emperor Trajan (Marcus Ulpius Traianus). The unit was raised after the annexation of the Nabataean Kingdom in 106 AD, when parts of the Nabataean royal army were drafted by Trajan into six cohortes equitatae.
- Petraeorum: from Petra or Arabia Petraea.
- sagittariorum or sagittaria: Archers.
- milliaria: 1000 strong. A Cohors milliaria peditata had a nominal strength of 800, a Cohors milliaria equitata of 1040.
- equitata: part-mounted.

The unit was a Cohors milliaria equitata with a nominal strength of 800 infantry (10 centuriae with 80 men each) and 240 cavalry (8 turmae with 30 cavalrymen each).

== History ==
The cohort was raised by Trajan in the newly created province of Arabia Petraea and soon moved to Cappadocia to fight in his Parthian war. The cavalry of the unit formed part of Arrian's expeditionary force in 135 AD, which he fielded against the Alans. It remained part of the Cappadocian army until the end of the fourth century, since it is attested in the Notitia dignitatum as Cohors tertia Ulpia miliaria Petraeorum in 394 AD.

== Garrisons ==
Possible garrisons in Cappadocia were:

- Metita: the Notitia dignitatum lists Cohors tertia Ulpia miliaria Petraeorum as stationed in Metita.

== Attested personnel ==
The following personnel is attested on diplomas or inscriptions:

=== Commanders ===
- C(aius) Castricius Vetulus, a tribune (CIL XI, 6010)
- Λ. Αβουρνιος Τουοκιανος, a χιλίαρχος
- M(arcus) Arruntius Frugi, a prefect (ca. 127/130) (AE 1908, 200)
- M(arcus) Sulpicius Felix, a tribune (ca. 144) (AE 1931, 36)

== See also ==
- List of Roman auxiliary regiments
