= Cohors I Ulpia Dacorum =

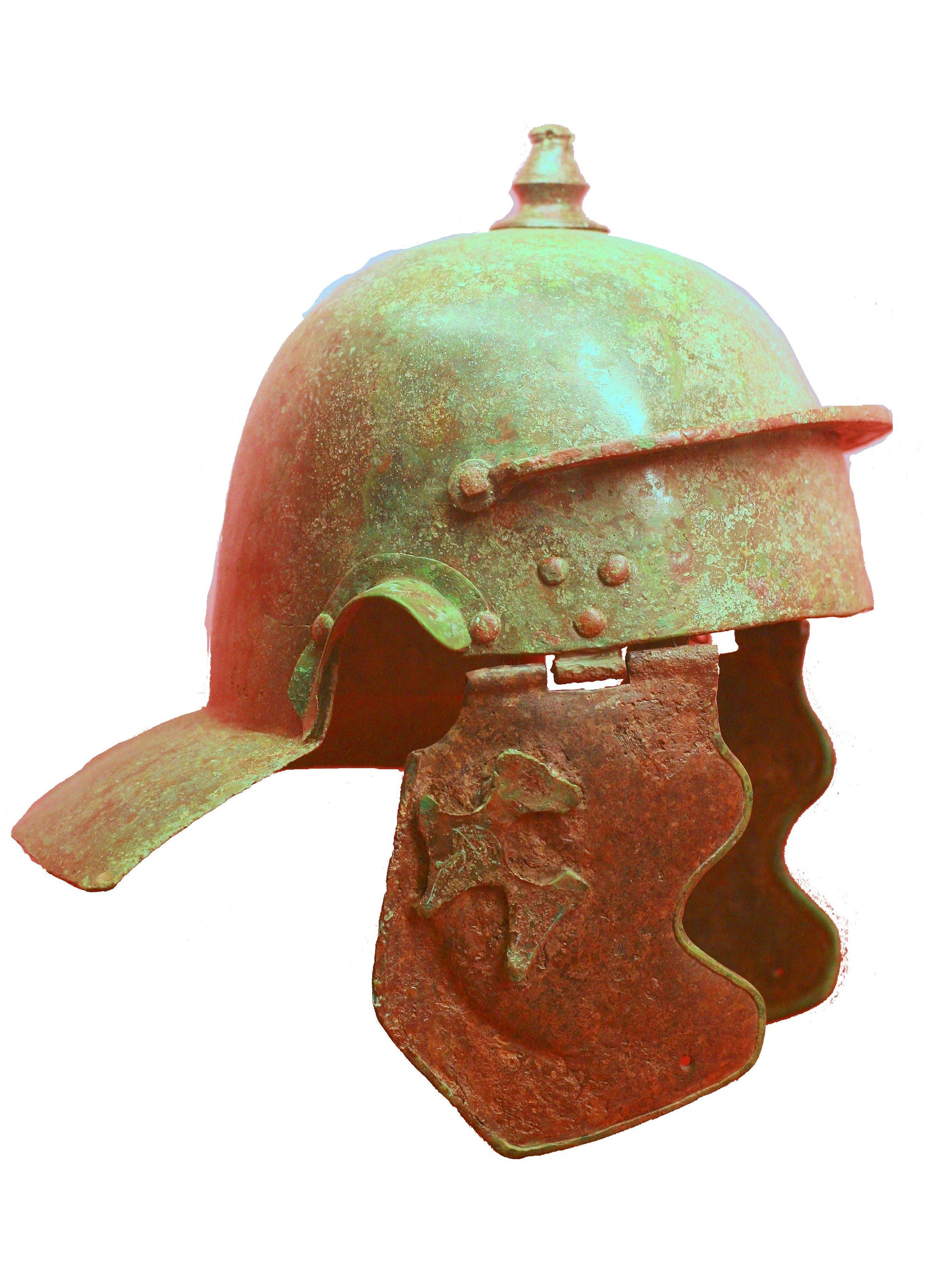
- Roman infantry helmet (late 1st century)
- Active: AD c. 110 to at least 156 (possibly until 395)
- Country: Roman Empire
- Type: Roman auxiliary cohort
- Role: infantry
- Size: 480
- Garrison/HQ: Syria

Cohors prima Ulpia Dacorum ("1st Ulpian cohort of Dacians") was an infantry regiment of the Auxilia corps of the Imperial Roman army. It was founded by the Roman emperor Trajan (r. 98–117), probably in preparation for his planned war against Parthia (113-6). The regiment's honorific title Ulpia refers to the emperor's gens, or clan-name (Marcus Ulpius Traianus).

During the Principate era (to AD 284), the regiment is attested (as such) in a single record, a Roman military diploma dated 156/7, which shows that the unit was at this time based in the Roman province of Syria: most likely, it had remained in the East after the end of the Parthian War.

The regiment's original recruits were probably mainly ethnic Moesians and Dacians from the recently conquered province of Dacia. The cohort consisted of 480 infantrymen, divided into 6 centuriae of 80 men each.

Two other auxiliary units attested in the epigraphic record, the cohorts II Aurelia Dacorum and III Aurelia Dacorum have been linked to I Ulpia Dacorum by some scholars. As their title implies, these units were established by the emperor Marcus Aurelius (r. 161–180), and it has been suggested that I Ulpia Dacorum was merged into one or both of these.

However, this theory is contradicted by the Notitia Dignitatum, a late Roman list of administrative and military commands, compiled in ca. AD 395. This document lists a regiment of this name as stationed in Syria, under the command of the Dux Syriae, at Fort Claudiana, an unidentified location. It is possible, however, that the Notitia contains data obsolete at the time of writing, and lists many units that had long since ceased to exist.

== See also ==
- Imperial Roman army
- Auxilia
- List of Roman auxiliary regiments
