= Cohors I Delmatarum milliaria equitata =

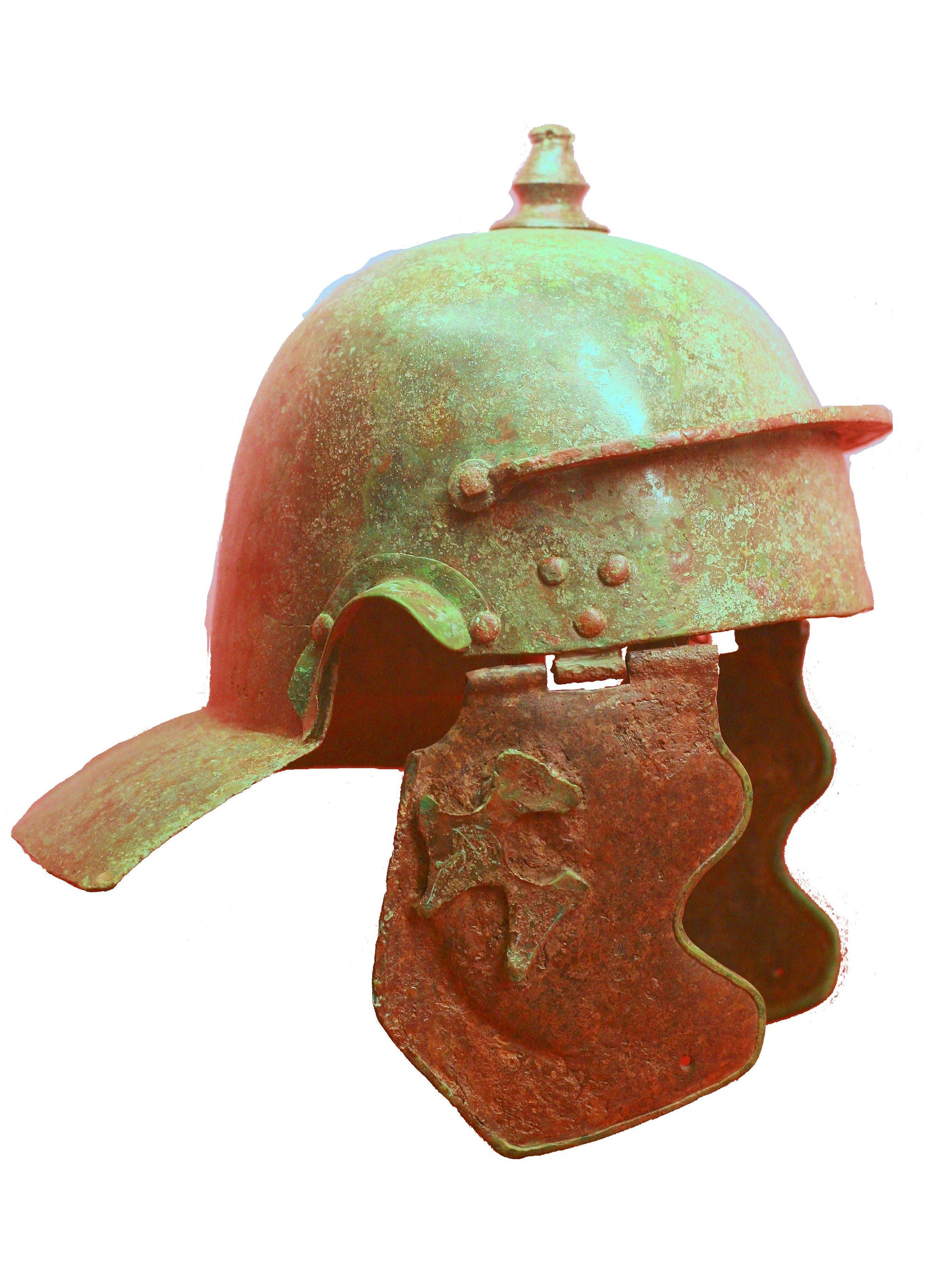
- Roman infantry helmet (late 1st century)
- Active: AD 14 to at least c. 200
- Country: Roman Empire
- Type: Roman auxiliary cohort
- Role: infantry/cavalry
- Size: 1,040 men (800 infantry, 240 cavalry)
- Garrison/HQ: province of Dalmatia (AD 170)

Cohors prima Delmatarum milliaria equitata ("1st part-mounted double-strength Cohort of Dalmatae") was a Roman auxiliary mixed infantry and cavalry regiment. It was named after, and originally recruited from, the Dalmatae (or Delmatae), an Illyrian-speaking people that inhabited the Adriatic coastal mountain range of the eponymous Dalmatia.

== Ethnic origin ==
The ancient geographer Strabo describes these mountains as extremely rugged, and the Dalmatae as backward and warlike. He claims that they did not use money long after their neighbours adopted it and that they "made war on the Romans for a long time". He also criticises the Dalmatae, a nation of pastoralists, for turning fertile plains into sheep pasture. Indeed, the name of the tribe itself is believed to mean "shepherds", derived from the Illyrian word delme ("sheep"). The final time this people fought against Rome was in the Illyrian revolt of AD 6–9. The revolt was started by Dalmatae auxiliary forces and soon spread all over Dalmatia and Pannonia. The resulting war was described by the Roman writer Suetonius as the most difficult faced by Rome since the Punic Wars two centuries earlier. But after the war, the Dalmatae became a loyal and important source of recruits for the Roman army.

== Service record ==
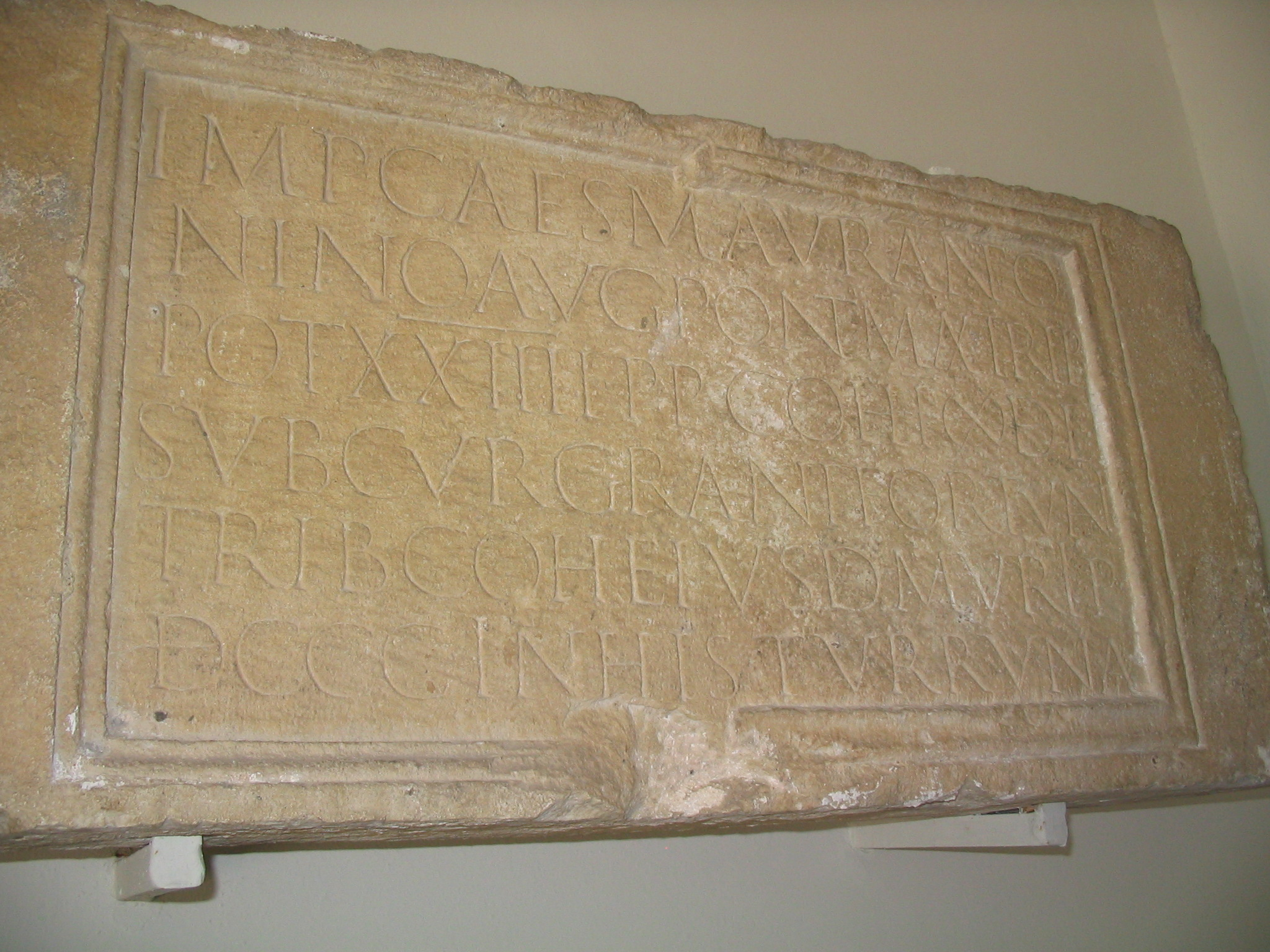
The Inscription of the Coh(ors) I (milliaria) Del(matarum) in Salona

According to Holder, a total of 12 cohortes Delmatarum appear to have been raised after the suppression of the Illyrian revolt, in two series, of 7 and 5 respectively. All these units were in existence by the time of emperor Claudius (r. 41–54) Of these, 9 appear to have survived into the 2nd century.

The regiment was probably founded by the end of the rule of the first Roman emperor, Augustus (AD 14) and was certainly in existence by the end of the rule of Claudius (r. 41–54). It was probably upgraded to double-strength in or after the 80's, which is when milliary units first appeared. The regiment is attested in 170 from a building inscription found in Salona, Dalmatia, where the unit was constructing a tower. An inscription dated c. 200 attests that the regiment participated in emperor Septimius Severus's Parthian campaign of 197–8. However, virtually all the unit's extant inscriptions have been found in Dalmatia, so it is likely that its long-term station was in this province. This was unusual, as the vast majority of auxiliary units were stationed on or near the empire's borders, whilst Dalmatia was an internal province.

== Attested personnel ==
As their ethnic names imply, auxiliary regiments were originally recruited from specific native peoples of the empire. They remained largely homogenous ethnically during the early Julio-Claudian era (to AD 37), but became more mixed later due to increased recruitment of local inhabitants of the provinces in which a unit was deployed. After AD 70, local recruitment became predominant and most regiments thus lost their original ethnic identity. However, cohors I Delmatarum was one of a minority of units that appear to have been stationed long-term in their original home province and thus probably retained its Dalmatian identity.

The names of four tribuni (regimental commanders) are attested. One dedicated a stone at Aime in Alpine Gaul and so probably originated there (c. 200). three centuriones (infantry officers) and one decurio (cavalry officer) are attested, of which one was buried in Salona and was therefore probably Illyrian. One caligatus (ranker) is attested.

== See also ==
- List of Roman auxiliary regiments
