= Cohors I Aurelia Antonina Hemesenorum milliaria =

Cohors I Aurelia Antonina Hemesenorum milliaria peditata
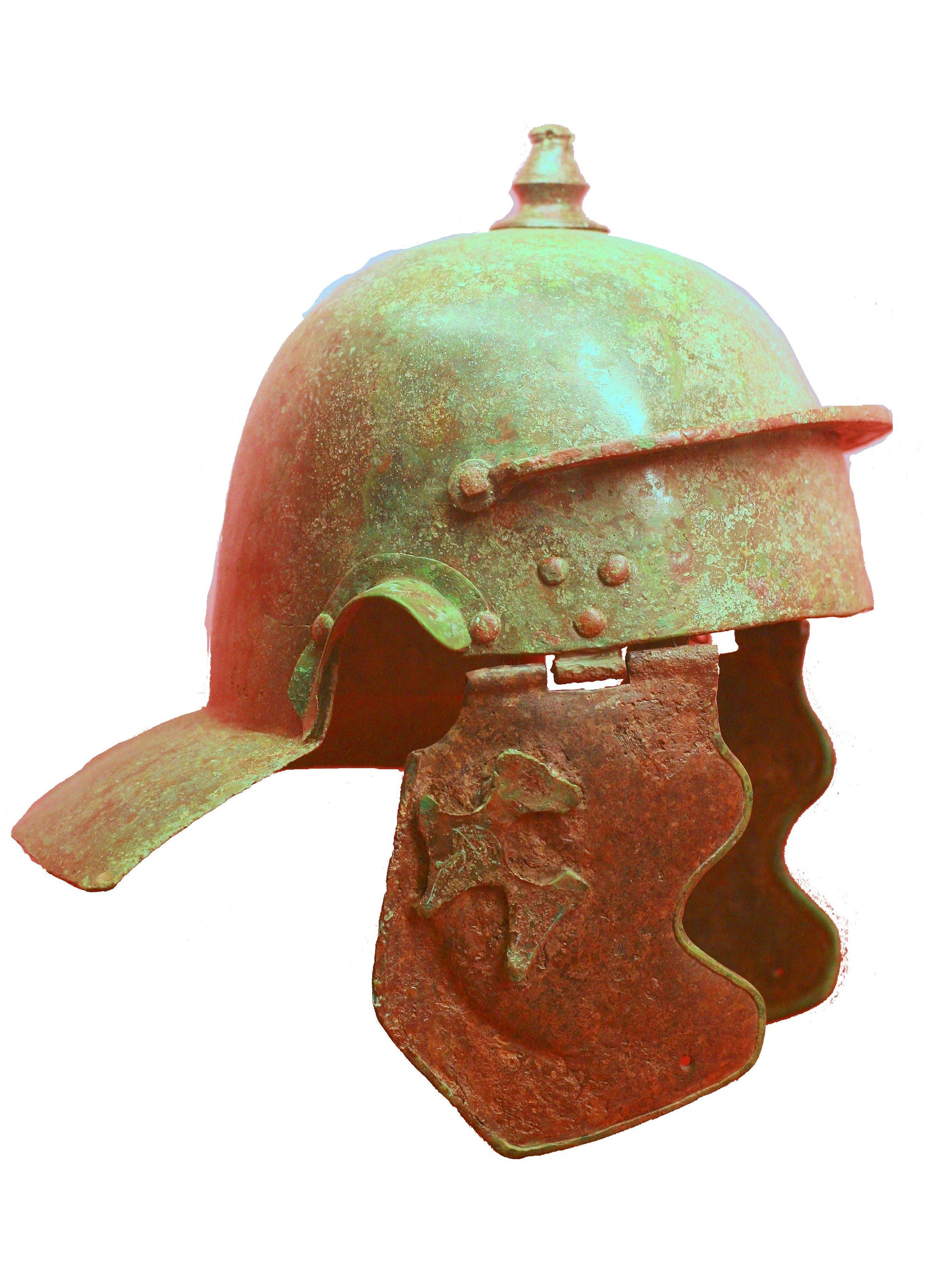
- Roman infantry helmet (late 1st century)
- Active: ?
- Country: Roman Empire
- Type: Roman auxiliary cohort
- Role: infantry
- Size: 800 men (800 infantry)

Cohors [prima] Aurelia Antonina Hemesenorum milliaria [peditata] ("[1st infantry 1000 strong] Aurelian and Antonine cohort of Hemesii?") was a Roman auxiliary infantry regiment. The cohort was stationed in Dacia at castra Micia.

== See also ==
- Roman auxiliaries
- List of Roman auxiliary regiments

== Sources ==
- Ovidiu Ţentea. 2012. Ex Oriente ad Danubium : the Syrian units on the Danube frontier of the Roman Empire. Bucharest: Mega. ISBN 9786065432062
