= Cohors IV Baetica =

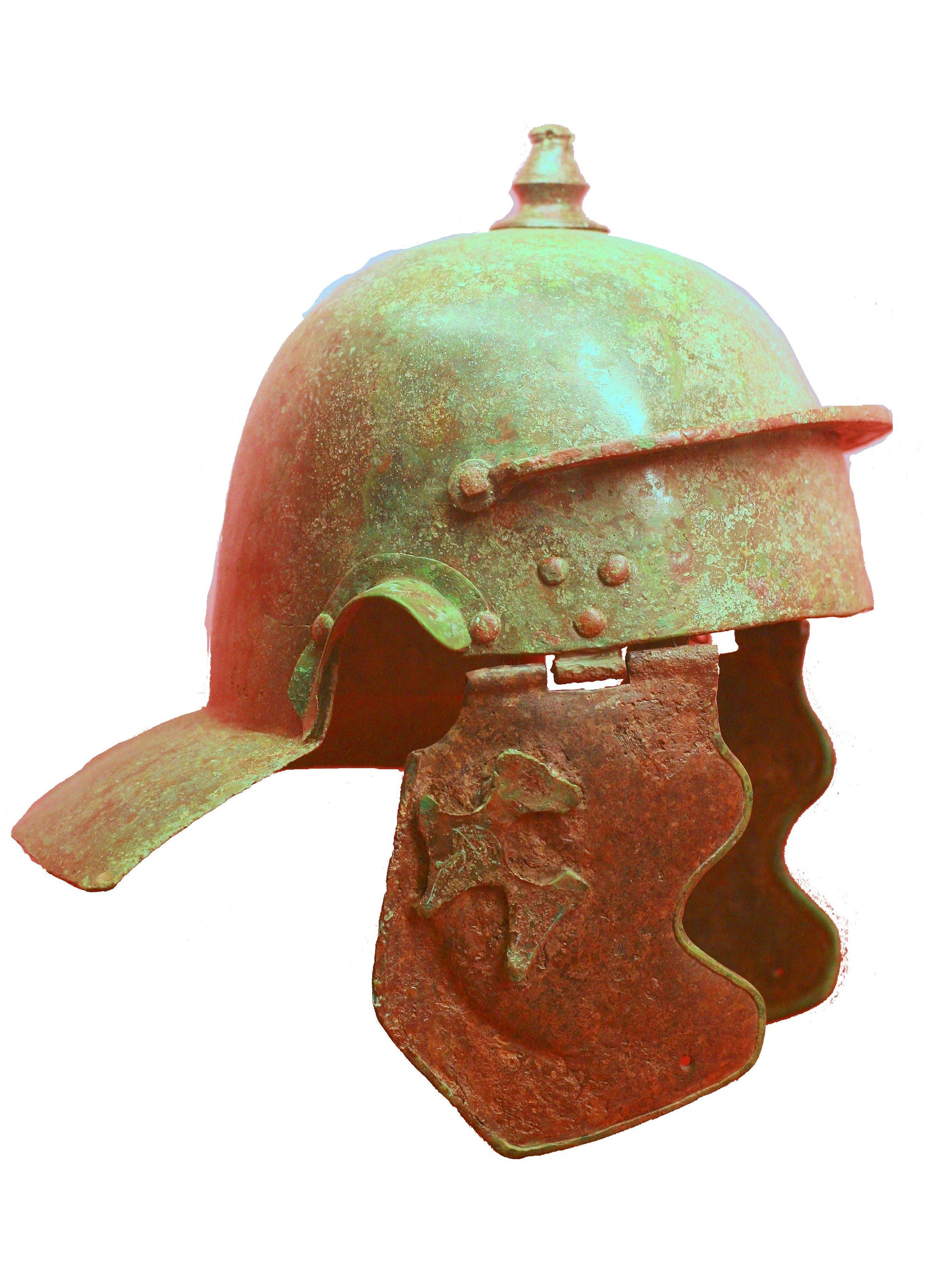
- Roman infantry helmet (late 1st century)
- Active: Not later than 14 BC
- Country: Roman Empire
- Type: Roman auxiliary cohort
- Role: infantry/cavalry
- Garrison/HQ: Castra of Olteni ?
- Engagements: prob. Dacian Wars (99–106)

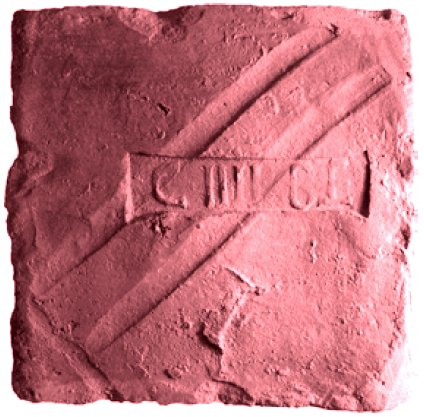
Inscription C IIII BE on stamped brick found at Olteni

The Cohors IV Baetica was a cohort of Roman auxiliaries. It was originally recruited from natives of Hispania Baetica, a Roman province created on 29 BC, after the division of province Hispania Ulterior.

In a bronze inscription dated 51–74 AD, which was found in Bergamo on 1871, it is mentioned a member of the cohors "M(arcus) Sempronius Fuscus praefectus cohortis Baeticae".

== See also ==
- List of Roman auxiliary regiments
