= Cohors I Hamiorum =

Cohors I Hamiorum sagittariorum
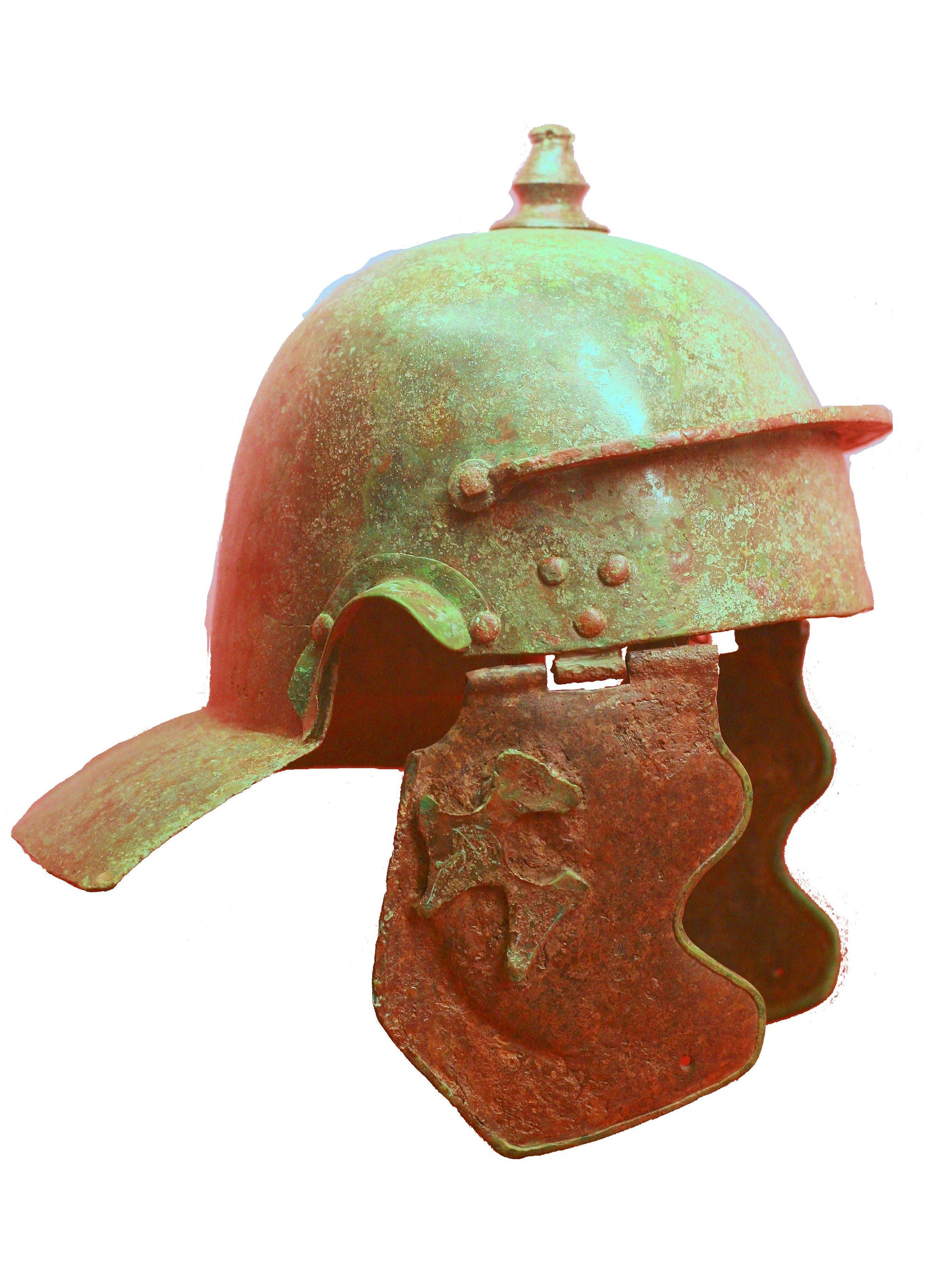
- Roman infantry helmet (late 1st century)
- Active: Early 2nd century to at least mid-2nd century
- Country: Roman Empire (Now in Syria )
- Type: Roman auxiliary cohort
- Role: Infantry
- Size: 480 men
- Garrison/HQ: Britannia 122-?

Cohors I Hamiorum sagittariorum ("1st Cohort of Hamian Archers") was a Roman auxiliary infantry unit of archers raised near the ancient city of Hama, Syria. It was a cohors quingenaria consisting of 480 men. The unit's origins are unknown and it is unclear when the unit was first created; however, its existence can be definitively attested in the reign of Hadrian. Military diplomas from the years 122 (CIL 16.69), 124 (CIL 16.70), 127 (RMD 240), and 135 AD (CIL 16.82) show that the unit was stationed in Britannia at Magnis (Carvoran). It is the only regiment of archers known to be stationed in Britain. The unit was transferred to Caledonia sometime during the reign of Antoninus Pius according to three inscriptions found at the Bar Hill Fort on the Antonine Wall. In 163 or 164 AD, the regiment was transferred back to Carvoran.

The regiment's whereabouts prior to its deployment in Britain are not known, but some scholars, such as Paul Holder, have posited that the regiment first arrived in Britain during the Roman conquest of Britain in 43 AD. A military diploma from the Balkans suggests that it is possible that the regiment could have participated in Trajan's Dacian Wars before it was sent to Britain.

== See also ==
- List of Roman auxiliary regiments
- Roman auxiliaries
