= Cohors VI Thracum quingenaria equitata =

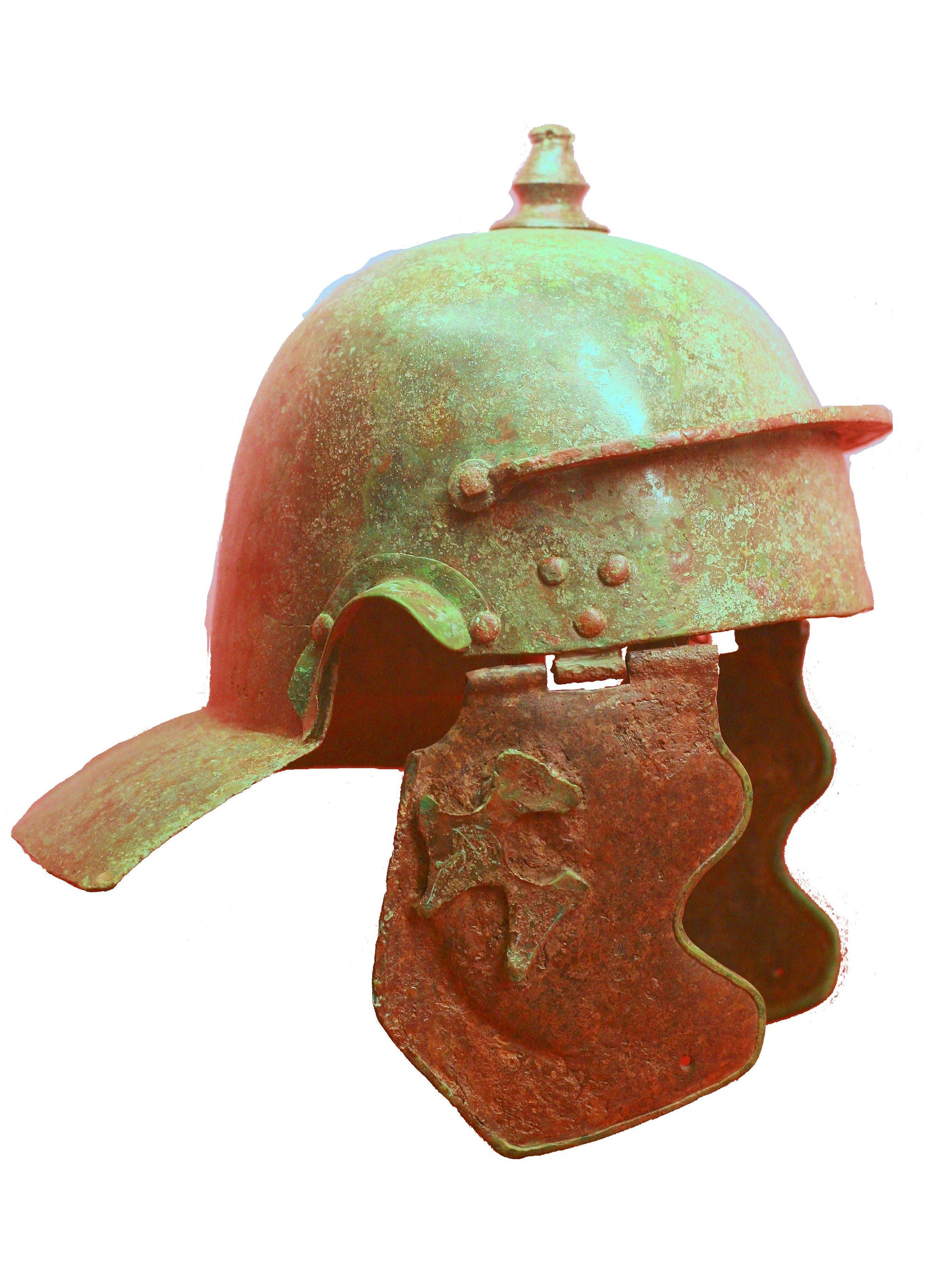
- Roman infantry helmet (late 1st century)
- Active: ?
- Country: Roman Empire
- Type: Roman auxiliary cohort
- Role: infantry/cavalry
- Size: 500 men (380 infantry, 120 cavalry)
- Garrison/HQ: Dacia, Moesia Inferior

Cohors VI Thracum quingenaria equitata ("6th part-mounted Cohort of Thracians") was a Roman auxiliary regiment containing cavalry contingents. The cohort activated on Dacia and Moesia Inferior provinces. In Dacia the unit stationed on castra from the limes of Dacia Porolissensis: Porolissum, Certinae and Optatiana.

== See also ==
- List of Roman auxiliary regiments
