= List of Roman auxiliary regiments =

The Roman Empire in AD 125, in the time of emperor Hadrian, showing the Roman provinces and legions deployed

This article lists auxilia, non-legionary auxiliary regiments of the imperial Roman army, attested in the epigraphic record, by Roman province of deployment during the reign of emperor Hadrian (r. AD 117–138).

The index of regimental names explains the origin of the names, most of which are based on the names of the subject tribes or cities of the empire where they were originally recruited. (As time went by, they became staffed by recruits from anywhere, especially from the province where they were deployed.)

== Types of regiment ==
During most of the Principate era, until AD 212, auxiliary regiments, called auxilia by the Romans, were formations kept separate from the legions, who were recruited from Roman citizens only. Auxilia were mostly recruited from the peregrini, the vast majority of subjects in the Roman Empire who did not hold Roman citizenship. (in AD 212, all the inhabitants of the empire were granted Roman citizenship).

There were three basic types of auxiliary regiment:

- alae, which contained only cavalry and consisted nominally of 480 soldiers
- cohortes peditatae or simply cohortes, which contained only infantry and consisted nominally of 480 soldiers
- cohortes equitatae, which contained infantry with an attached cavalry contingent and consisted nominally of 600 soldiers, of which 480 were infantry and 120 were cavalry

A number of regiments, of all three types, were designated sagittariorum (sagitt), indicating that their members were equipped as archers. After about AD 80, about 12 percent of regiments were enlarged from the quingenarie size and designated milliarie, which nominally consisted of 1000 soldiers, but in reality consisted of 720 soldiers, 800 soldiers, and 1040 soldiers respectively.

== Contents of tables ==
Table I below lists auxiliary regiments during Hadrian's rule, for which there is the most comprehensive evidence. The table does not show regiments that were attested to in the 1st century but that, according to Holder, were dissolved by AD 117, nor those that were probably founded after AD 138. The precise number of regiments that existed during Hadrian's rule is disputed. (Note: The number of units is 327 according to Spaul and 367 according to Holder. This discrepancy is due to the existence of several units with the same serial number and name, but attested in various provinces. It is not clear if they were different units or the same units moved around. In the table, Holder's estimate has been followed. In addition, 14 units attested until about 100 CE, which Holder considers likely but not certain to have survived into Hadrian's reign are also included to present all possible units (making a total of 381 units).) The regiments are listed by the Roman province where they were deployed c. AD 130.

- Boldface entries: denotes a unit of double strength
- eq: denotes a part-mounted unit
- c.R: denotes a unit composed of Roman citizens
- sagitt: denotes a unit composed of archers

== Ethnic composition of regiments ==
The rule of the first emperor, Augustus, (30 BC–AD 14) saw the foundation of the majority of the regiments attested in Hadrian's time. In the earlier part of this period, regiments were raised from and named after individual tribes, for example Campagonum, Trevirorum and Bessorum. Later, units were raised from and named after broad national groups, for example Hispanorum, Gallorum, and Thracum.

There is very little evidence concerning the organisation and policies of auxiliary recruitment. The ethnic origins of auxiliary recruits are attested in only a tiny fraction of cases. For example, the cohors II Gallorum veterana equitata must have recruited a calculated 8,000 soldiers over its probable lifespan of about 250 years but the origins of only two rankers are known. (Note: The calculation assumes an average performed service of 15 years) Conclusions about auxiliary recruitment drawn by scholars from the available evidence are regarded as tentative.

According to Holder, during the Julio-Claudian dynasty (AD 14–68), regimental ethnic identity was preserved to some extent, with evidence of continued recruitment from the original people. By the time of Hadrian, however, a regiment's name, in most cases, probably represented the ethnic origin of few, if any, of its members. This is because during the Flavian dynasty (AD 69–96), as a matter of deliberate policy, most regiments were deployed in provinces far from their original home and drew the majority of their recruits from local natives and the rest from all parts of the empire. In most cases, therefore, a regiment's name had become an identification tag devoid of ethnic significance. A regiment deployed long-term in the same province would thus, over time, acquire the ethnic character of its host population.

There are exceptions to this rule:

- A minority of regiments remained stationed in their original home province, e.g., cohors I Delmatarum mill eq, still attested in Dalmatia in AD 130.
- Regiments founded a relatively short period before AD 130, for example cohors I Aelia Dacorum which was stationed in Roman Britain in AD 130 would probably still have contained mostly Dacian recruits at this time, as it had been established by Hadrian only about a decade earlier.
- Some specialised regiments, such as Syrian archers and the elite Batavi show some evidence of continued preferential recruitment from their original province.

== List of auxilia in the reign of Hadrian ==
=== List of auxilia non-ethnic regimental names by province of deployment ===
==== Britannia ====
Britannia
ALAE	XXX	COHORTES	COHORTES	COHORTES
Agrippina Miniata; I Hispanorum Asturum; II Asturum; **Augusta Gallorum Petrianac.R.** (Note: a regiment having twice the soldiers of a standard quingenaria unit); Augusta Gallorum Proculeiana; Gallorum Picentiana; II Gallorum Sebosiana; Gallorum et Thracum classiana I Pannoniorum (Sabiniana); I Pannoniorum Tampiana; I Thracum; I Tungrorum; Hispanorum Vettonum; Augusta Vocontiorum		I Aquitanorum; II Asturum eq IV Breucorum; I Augusta Bracarum; III Bracaraugustanorum; I Baetasiorum c.R. I Batavorum eq I Celtiberorum; I Aelia classica I Ulpia Cugernorum c.R. **I Aelia Dacorum**; I Delmatarum; II Delmatarum; IV Delmatarum; I Frisiavonum	II Gallorum veterana eq IV Gallorum eq V Gallorum; VI Gallorum; I Hispanorum eq **I Aelia Hispanorum eq** I Lingonum eq II Lingonum eq III Lingonum eq IV Lingonum eq I Menapiorum; I Morinorum; I nauticarum **I Nerviana Germanorum eq** I Nervanorum; I Nerviorum; II Nerviorum	III Nerviorum; IV Nerviorum; VI Nerviorum; II Pannoniorum; V Raetorum; VI Raetorum; I Sunucorum; I Thracum; II Thracum veterana VII Thracum; **I Tungrorum**; **II Tungrorum c.L. eq** **I Vangionum eq** **I Vardulorum c.R. eq** II Vasconum c.R. I Hamiorum sagitt

==== Germania Inferior ====
Germania Inferior
ALAE	XXX	COHORTES	COHORTES
Afrorum veterana Longiniana Gallorum; Gallorum et Thracum classiana Moesica felix I Noricorum c.R. Sulpicia c.R. I Thracum		II Asturum; III Breucorum; VI Breucorum; VI Brittonum; I civium Romanorum eq II civium Romanorum eq I classica II Hispanorum; I Flavia Hispanorum eq	**VI ingenuorum c.R.** I Latobicorum et Varcianorum; I Lucensium; I Pannoniorum et Delmatarum eq I Raetorum eq c.R. VI Raetorum; IV Thracum eq II Varcianorum eq XV voluntariorum c.R.

==== Germania Superior ====
Germania Superior
ALAE	XXX	COHORTES	COHORTES
Gallorum Indiana; I Scubulorum		I Aquitanorum veterana III Aquitanorum eq c.R. IV Aquitanorum eq c.R. I Asturum equitata eq I Biturigum; Augusta Cyrenaica eq II Augusta Cyrenaica; **I Flavia Damascenorum**; III Delmatarum eq V Delmatarum; I Germanorum c.R.	I Helvetiorum; II Hispanorum eq Ituraeorum c.R. I Ligurum et Hispanorum c.R. II Raetorum c.R. VII Raetorum eq IV Vindelicorum; XXIV voluntariorum c.R. XXVI voluntariorumc.R. XXX voluntariorum c.R. XXXII voluntariorum c.R.

==== Raetia/Noricum ====
Raetia/Noricum
ALAE	XXX	COHORTES	COHORTES
I Hispanorum Auriana; I Commagenorum; **II Flavia**; I Flavia gemina c.R. I Flavia singularium		II Aquitanorum eq c.R. I Asturum; **II Batavorum**; **IX Batavorum eq** V Bracaraugustanorum; I Breucorum c.R. V Breucorum c.R. eq III Britannorum; **I Aelia Brittonum**; I Raetorum; II Raetorum	II Thracum; III Thracum c.R. III Thracum veterana IV Tungrorum veterana **I Flavia Canathenorum** sagitt mill

==== Pannonia ====
Pannonia (Superior and Inferior)
ALAE	XXX	COHORTES	COHORTES
I Hispanorum Aravacorum; **I Flavia Britannica c.R.** I Brittonum c.R. I Cananefatium; I civium Romanorum; I Augusta Ituraeorum; I Praetoria singularium c.R. I Thracum victrix II Augusta Thracum **Ulpia contariorum** (Note: equites cataphractarii); I Thracum veterana sagitt III Augusta Thracum sagitt		I Alpinorum eq I Alpinorum peditata Cohors II Alpinorum equitata II Asturum et Callaecorum eq **III Batavorum eq** VII Breucorum c.R. eq I Brittonum; V Callaecorum Lucensium eq I Campanorum voluntariorum c.R. **II Augusta Dacorum eq** I Lusitanorum Cyrenaica; III Lusitanorum; I Montanorum eq	I Noricorum eq **I Ulpia Pannoniorum eq** I Thracum c.R. I Thracum Germanica; I Thracum Syriaca equitata eq II Augusta Thracum eq **I Aelia Caesariensis sagitt** **I Aelia Gaesatorum sagitt**

==== Moesia Superior ====
Moesia Superior
ALAE	XXX	COHORTES	COHORTES
I Claudia nova miscellanea Gallorum Flaviana		III Brittonum veterana eq III campestris c.R. V Gallorum eq V Gallorum et Pannoniorum; V Hispanorum eq I Pannoniorum veterana eq	I Antiochensium sagitt I Cretum eq sagitt

==== Moesia Inferior ====
Moesia Inferior
ALAE	XXX	COHORTES	COHORTES
Gallorum Atectorigiana; I Claudia Gallorum Capitoniana; I Vespasiana Dardanorum; I Flavia Gaetulorum; II Hispanorum Aravacorum; I Gallorum et Pannoniorum cataphractaria		I Lusitanorum; I Thracum Syriaca; I Sugambrorum tironum II Lucensium; I Bracarorum c.R. I Lepidiana c.R.	I Claudia Sugambrorum veterana eq I Flavia Numidarum eq II Bracaraugustanorum eq II Flavia Brittonum eq **II Mattiacorum eq** II Chalcidenorum sagitt **I Cilicum eq sagitt**

==== Dacia ====
Dacia (inc. Dacia Superior, Inferior and Porolissensis)
ALAE	XXX	COHORTES	COHORTES	COHORTES
I Asturum **I Batavorum**; **I Bosporanorum**; I Hispanorum Campagonum; I Gallorum et Bosporanorum; II Gallorum et Pannoniorum; I Hispanorum; II Pannoniorum; II Pannoniorum veterana I Tungrorum Frontoniana I Flavia Commagenorum sagitt numerus equitum Illyricorum		I Afrorum c.R. eq **I Batavorum eq c.R. p.f.** II Flavia Bessorum; I Bracaraugustanorum; **I Britannica c.R. eq** **II Britannorum c.R.** **I Flavia Brittonum eq** I Ulpia Brittonum; I Augusta Brittonum Nerviana; II Augusta Brittonum Nerviana; I Cananefatium; I Flavia Commagenorum; II Flavia Commagenorum; IV Baetica	I Cypria c.R. II Gallorum; II Gallorum Dacica; II Gallorum Macedonica eq II Gallorum Pannonica; III Gallorum; I Hispanorum; I Hispanorum veterana eq I Flavia Ulpia Hispanorum c.R. eq II Hispanorum scutata c.R. IV Hispanorum eq V Lingonum	I Aurelia Antonina Hemesenorum; II Flavia Numidarum; VIII Raetorum eq c.R. VI Thracum eq Ubiorum eq I Ubiorum; **I Vindelicorum c.R. eq** I Augusta Ituraerorum sagitt I Thracum sagitt I Tyriorum sagitt

==== Cappadocia ====
Cappadocia
ALAE	XXX	COHORTES	COHORTES
II Ulpia Auriana; I Augusta gemina colonorum I Ulpia Dacorum; II Gallorum; I Parthorum veterana		I Apula c.R. I Bosporanorum; I Claudia eq II Claudia; **I Hamiorum c.R.** **I Italica voluntariorum c.R.** **milliaria c.R. eq** I Numidarum	**II Ulpia Petraeorum eq** **III Ulpia Petraeorum** sagitt mill eq I Raetorum eq IV Raetorum eq III Augusta Cyrenaica sagitt

==== Syria Coele, Syria Phoenice, Syria Palestina (former Iudea) and Arabia Petraea ====
ALAE	XXX	COHORTES	COHORTES	COHORTES
I Flavia Agrippiana; II Flavia Agrippiana; Gaetulorum veterana I Phrygum; VII Phrygum; I Ulpia singularium I Thracum Herculanea; Augusta Xoitana; **I Ulpia dromedariorum** Gallorum et Thracum Antiana sagitt		III Bracarum; IV Bracarugustanorum; III Callaecorum Bracarum; IV Callaecorum Lucensium; II Cantabrorum; II classica I Ulpia Dacorum; III Dacorum; I Damascena Armeniaca; II equitum eq II Ulpia equitatum eq I Flavia; I Gaetulorum; I Ulpia Galatarum	II Ulpia Galatarum; VII Gallorum eq V gemella c.R. VI Hispanorum; II Ligurum et Corsorum; I Lucensium; I Augusta Lusitanorum; I Montanorum; I Augusta Pannoniorum; II Ulpia Paphlagonum; III Ulpia Paphlagonum eq IV Ulpia Petreorum; V Ulpia Petreorum eq VI Ulpia Petreorum	**I Sebastena**; **I Thracum**; III Augusta Thracum; II Thracum Syriaca; III Thracum Syriaca; IV Thracum Syriaca; I Ascalonitanorum sagitt I Flavia Chalcidenorum eq sagitt I Damascenorum sagitt **II Italica voluntariorum c.R. sagitt** I Ulpia Petreorum eq sagitt I Ulpia c.R. sagitt I Augusta Thracum eq sagitt

==== Aegyptus ====
Aegyptus
ALAE	XXX	COHORTES	COHORTES
Apriana; Augusta Syriaca; Commagenorum; Gallorum veterana I Thracum Macedonica; Vocontiorum		I Ulpia Afrorum eq I Flavia Cilicum eq II Ituraeorum; III Ituraeorum; I Aug. praetoria Lusitanorum eq I Macedonica eq	I Pannoniorum; I Thebaeorum eq II Thebaeorum scutata c.R. I Apamenorum eq sagitt

==== Mauretania Tingitana, Mauretania Caesariensis, Numidia and Africa Proconsularis ====
ALAE	XXX	COHORTES	COHORTES	COHORTES
III Asturum; I Augusta c.R. I Augusta Gallorum; I Gallorum Tauriana victrix Gemelliana c.R. I Flavia Numidica; **I Augusta Nerviana**; Ala I Pannoniorum; II Augusta Thracum; I Hamiorum sagitt Parthorum sagitt I Syrorum sagitt II Syrorum sagitt		I Flavia Afrorum; II Flavia Afrorum; I Asturum et Callaecorum; III Asturum c.R. eq II Breucorum; II Brittonum eq I Chalcidenorum eq VI Commagenorum eq I Corsorum c.R. V Delmatarum c.R.	Aelia expedita I Flavia eq III Gallorum felix IV Gallorum c.R. II Hamiorum; I Flavia Hispanorum; **II Hispanorum c.R. eq** I Ituraeorum c.R. I Lemavorum c.R. VII Lusitanorum eq	I Flavia Musulamiorum eq I Nurritanorum; II Sardorum; IV Sugambrorum; **IV Tungrorum**; I Syrorum sagitt **II Syrorum eq sagitt**

==== Other locations ====
Internal provinces & unknown locations
ALAE	XXX	COHORTES	COHORTES
II Flavia Hispanorum (HISP)		Cohors III Alpinorum equitata (DLM); I Aelia Athoitarum (THR); I Ausetanorum (HISP?); I Flavia Bessorum (MCD); Callaecorum (?); I Celtiberorum eq (HISP); I Cisipadensium c.R. (THR); Dacorum (?); I Gallica c.R. eq (HISP); I Delmatarum mill eq (DLM)	**I Ligurum** (AS?); Maritima (BAE); Maurorum et Afrorum (?); **I Musulamiorum** (LYC); VI praetoria (BYT); III sagittariorum (?); I/II nova tironum (HISP); VIII voluntariorum (DLM); XXV voluntariorum (HISP?)

=== List of auxilia ethnic regimental names ===
List of auxilia ethnic regimental names
Regimental name	Original tribe/city	Roman province	Original territory now in	Native language	Further information
Afrorum	Afri	Africa	Tunisia	Berber	
Alpinorum	Salassi	Alpes Tres	Val d'Aosta, NW Italy	Ligurian	Alpine regiments of the Roman army
Antiochensium	Antiochenses	Syria	Antakya, Turkey	Aramaic	
Aquitanorum	Aquitani	Gallia Aquitania	Aquitaine, SW France	Aquitanian	
Apamenorum	Apameni	Syria	Apamea, Syria	Aramaic	
Aravacorum	Arevaci	Hispania Tarraconensis	Burgos pr Spain	Celtiberian	
Aresacorum	Aresaci	Germania Inferior	?	W Germanic	
Ascalonitanorum	Ascalonitani	Judaea	Ascalon, Israel	Aramaic	
Asturum	Astures	Hispania T.	Asturias, N Spain	Celtiberian	
Athoitarum	Autariatae	Dalmatia	Bosnia	Illyrian	
Ausetanorum	Ausetani	Hispania T.	N Barcelona pr Spain	Iberian	
Baetasiorum	Baetasii	Germania Inferior	S Netherlands	W Germanic	
Batavorum	Batavi	Germania Inferior	Betuwe, E Netherlands	W Germanic	
Bessorum	Bessi	Thracia	Mid Bulgaria	Thracian	
Biturigum	Bituriges	Gallia Lugdunensis	Berry, C France	Gaulish	
Bosporanorum	Bosporani	Regnum Bospori	Crimea	Greek/Sarmatian	
Bracarorum; Bracarum; Bracaraugustanorum	Bracari	Hispania T.	Minho, Portugal	Gallaecian	
Breucorum	Breuci	Dalmatia	N Bosnia	Illyrian	
Brittonum; Britannorum	Brittones (Britanni)	Britannia	N Britain	Brythonic	
Callaecorum	Gallaeci	Hispania T.	Galicia, NW Spain	Gallaecian	
Campagonum	Campagones	Hispania T.	N Spain	Celtiberian (C)	
Campanorum	(Roman cit)	Italia	Campania, Italy	Latin	
Canathenorum	Canatheni	Syria	Canatha, Syria	Aramaic	
Cannanefatium	Cananefates	Germania Inferior	S Holland, Netherlands	W Germanic	
Cantabrorum	Cantabri	Hispania T.	Cantabria N Spain	Celtiberian	
Celtiberorum	Celtiberi	Hispania T.	Guadalajara, Spain	Celtiberian	
Chalcidenorum	Chalcideni	Bithynia	Chalcedon, Turkey	Greek	
Cilicum	Cilices	Cilicia	Icel/Adana pr Turkey	Lydian	
Cisipadensium	(Roman citizens)	Italia (Aemilia region)	Emilia-Romagna, Italy	Latin	
Commagenorum	Commagene	Cappadocia	Gaziantep pr Turkey	Greek	
Corsorum	Corsi	Sardinia	N Sardinia, Italy	Sardinian	
Cretum	Cretes	Creta	Crete, Greece	Greek	
Cugernorum	Cugerni	Germania Inferior	NW Rhineland, Germany	W Germanic	
Dardanorum	Dardani	Macedonia	S Serbia/Kosovo	Illyrian	
Dacorum	Daci	Dacia	Romania	Dacian	
Damascenorum	Damasceni	Syria	Damascus, Syria	Aramaic	
Delmatarum	Dalmatae	Dalmatia	Dalmacja, Croatia	Illyrian	
Frisiavonum	Frisiavones	Germania Inferior	N Brabant S Neth	W Germanic	
Gaesatorum	Gaesati	Gallia Belgica	Alsace, Fr	Gaulish	
Gaetulorum	Gaetuli	Mauretania	Algeria	Berber	
Galatarum	Galatae	Galatia	Ankara pr C Turkey	Galatian	
Gallorum	Gauls	Gallia Lugdunensis	NE France	Gaulish	
Hamiorum	Hama	Syria	Hama, Syria	Aramaic	
Helvetiorum	Helvetii	Belgica	SW Switzerland	Gaulish	
Hemesenorum	Emesa	Syria	Homs, Syria	Aramaic	
Hispanorum	Hispani	Hispania T.	N Spain	Celtiberian	
Illyricorum	Illyrici	Dalmatia	Bosnia	Illyrian	
Ituraeorum	Ituraei	Syria	S Lebanon	Aramaic	
Latobicorum	Latobici	Pannonia	C Bosnia	Illyrian	
Lemavorum	Lemavi	Hispania T.	Galicia, Spain	Gallaecian	
Ligurum	Ligures	Italia (Liguria)	Liguria, Italy	Ligurian	Alpine regiments of the Roman army
Lingonum	Lingones	Belgica	Langres, NE France	Gaulish	
Lucensium	Lucenses	Hispania T.	cLugo Galicia, Portugal	Gallaecian	
Lusitanorum	Lusitani	Lusitania	Portugal	Lusitanian	
Mattiacorum	Mattiaci	Germania Sup	Rhineland Pfalz, Germany	W Germanic	
Maurorum	Mauri	Mauretania	Morocco	Berber	
Menapiorum	Menapii	Belgica	W Flanders, Belgium	Gaulish	
Morinorum	Morini	Belgica	Pas-de-Calais, France	Gaulish	
Montanorum	Montani	Pannonia	Julian Alps, Slovenia	Raetian	Alpine regiments of the Roman army
Musulamiorum	Musulamii	Mauretania	E Algeria	Berber	
Nerviorum	Nervii	Belgica	Flandres, France	Gaulish	
Noricorum	Taurisci	Noricum	Mid Austria	(C)	Alpine regiments of the Roman army
Numidarum	Numidae	Numidia	NE Algeria	Berber	
Nurritanorum	Nurritani	Sardinia	cNuoro, N Sardinia, Italy	Sardinian	
Pannoniorum	Pannonii	Pannonia	W Hungary	Illyrian	
Parthorum	Parthi	Cappadocia	E Turkey	Parthian	
Petreorum	Nabataei	Arabia Pet.	cPetra, Jordan	Arabic	
Phrygum	Phryges	Galatia	Eskisehir, W Turkey	Phrygian	
Raetorum	Raeti	Raetia	S Germany/Switzerland	Raetian (X/C)	Alpine regiments of the Roman army
Sardorum	Sardi	Sardinia	S Sardinia, Italy	Sardinian	
Scubulorum	Scubuli	Macedonia	cSkopje, Macedonia	Illyrian	
Sequanorum	Sequani	Belgica	Franche-Comté, France	Gaulish	
Sugambrorum	Sicambri	Germania Inferior	NW Rhineland, Germany	W Germanic	
Sunucorum	Sunici	Germania Inferior	E Netherlands	W Germanic	
Syrorum	Syri	Syria	Syria	Aramaic	
Thebaeorum	Thebaei	Aegyptus	Thebes, Egypt	Egyptian	
Trachonitarum	?	Syria?	?	(X/S)	
Thracum	Thraces	Thracia	Bulgaria	Thracian	
Trevirorum	Treveri	Belgica	cTrier, Germany	Gaulish	
Tungrorum	Tungri	Belgica	cTongeren (Tongres), Belgium	Gaulish	
Tyriorum	Tyrii	Syria	Tyre, S Lebanon	Phoenician	
Ubiorum	Ubii	Germania Inferior	NW Rhineland, Germany	W Germanic	
Vangionum	Vangiones	Germania Sup	Mainz/Worms, Germany	W Germanic	
Varcianorum	Varciani	Pannonia	E Croatia	Illyrian	
Vardulorum	Varduli	Hispania T.	Guipuzcoa, Spain	Celtiberian	
Vasconum	Vascones	Hispania T.	Navarra, Spain	Old Basque	
Vettonum	Vettones	Lusitania	Salamanca pr Spain	Celtiberian	
Vindelicorum	Vindelici	Raetia	Black Forest, Germany	Celtic/German	Alpine regiments of the Roman army
Vocontiorum	Vocontii	Gallia Lugdunensis	Dauphiné, France	Gaulish	

== Glossary ==
Some regiments were named after other people, for example ala Sulpicia after its first, or early, praefectus. In the Augustan era, commanders of auxiliary units were often Roman legionary centurions, or native chieftains. For example, ala Gallorum Atectorigiana was probably once commanded by a Gallic chieftain named Atectorix. Later, emperor Claudius restricted auxiliary commands to the lower aristocratic class of equites only.

=== Imperial dedications ===
Augusta
founded by emperor Augustus (r. BC 30–AD 14), or honoured with this title by any of his successors
Claudia
founded by, or honoured by, one of: Tiberius (r. AD 14–37), Caligula (r. AD 37–41), or Claudius (r. AD 41–54), all of whom were members of the gens Claudia
Flavia
Vespasian (r. AD 69–79) or one of his two sons and successors, Titus (r. AD 79–81) or Domitian (r. AD 81–96)
Ulpia
Trajan (r. AD 98–117)
Aelia
Hadrian (r. AD 117–138)
Aurelia
Marcus Aurelius (r. AD 161–180)
Septimia
Septimius Severus (r. AD 197–211)

In the 4th century, Valeria referred to emperor Diocletian (r. AD 284–305) and Flavia to Constantine I (r. AD 312–337) or one of his successors.

=== Raised during the Illyrian revolt ===
Names of regiments originally raised by emperor Augustus during the Illyrian revolt (AD 6–9) from Roman citizens unsuitable for service in legions, such as vagrants, convicted criminals, debtors, and emancipated slaves:

civium Romanorum
regiment originally composed of Roman citizens (including emancipated slaves)
ingenuorum
regiment originally composed of free-born (ingenui) Roman citizens
voluntariorum
regiment originally composed of volunteers (voluntarii), in reality slaves freed in return for military service during the Illyrian revolt

After their initial recruitment of Roman citizens, these regiments recruited non-citizens (peregrini) like all other regiments.

=== Other non-ethnic regimental names ===
classica
the regiment was originally recruited, probably during the Illyrian revolt, from naval personnel (from classis = "fleet"), who were mostly non-citizens
nauticarum
from nautae= "sailors"
maritima
praetoria
originally a cohort of the Praetorian Guard in Rome. Apparently a detachment of the cohort was left behind at the end of an imperial campaign, presumably to form the core of a new auxiliary cohort, retaining the prestigious name
singularium
ala formed around members of the elite equites singulares Augusti (imperial horseguards), left behind to reinforce frontier at the end of an imperial campaign
contariorum
specialised regiment of lancers (contarii) from contus (a long lance)
dromedariorum
specialised regiment of camel-mounted troops for desert warfare

=== Unit Epithets ===
Some regiment names included additional descriptors:

civium Romanorum (c.R.)
"of Roman citizens", honorific title awarded by the emperor to a regiment for valour. All current (but not future) members would be granted Roman citizenship, and the regiment would retain the title in perpetuity.
pia fidelis (p.f.)
veterana
uncertain meaning which may have been used to distinguish older unit from a newer unit with the same serial number and name
tironum
from tirones ("trainees")

== See also ==
- Auxilia
- List of Roman legions

== Sources ==
- Holder, Paul (2003). "Auxiliary deployment in the reign of Hadrian". Bulletin of the Institute of Classical Studies. 46 (S81). Blackwell Publishing: 101–145. doi:10.1111/j.2041-5370.2003.tb01979.x. ISSN 2041-5370.
- Spaul, John E. H. (2000). Cohors² : the evidence for and a short history of the auxiliary infantry units of the Imperial Roman army. BAR, International series. Vol. 841. Oxford: Archaeopress. ISBN 9781841710464.
- Spaul, John E. H.; Cichorius, Conrad (1994). Ala² : the auxiliary cavalry units of the pre-Diocletianic imperial Roman army. Andover: Nectoreca Press. ISBN 9780952506201.
