= Cohors II Alpinorum equitata =

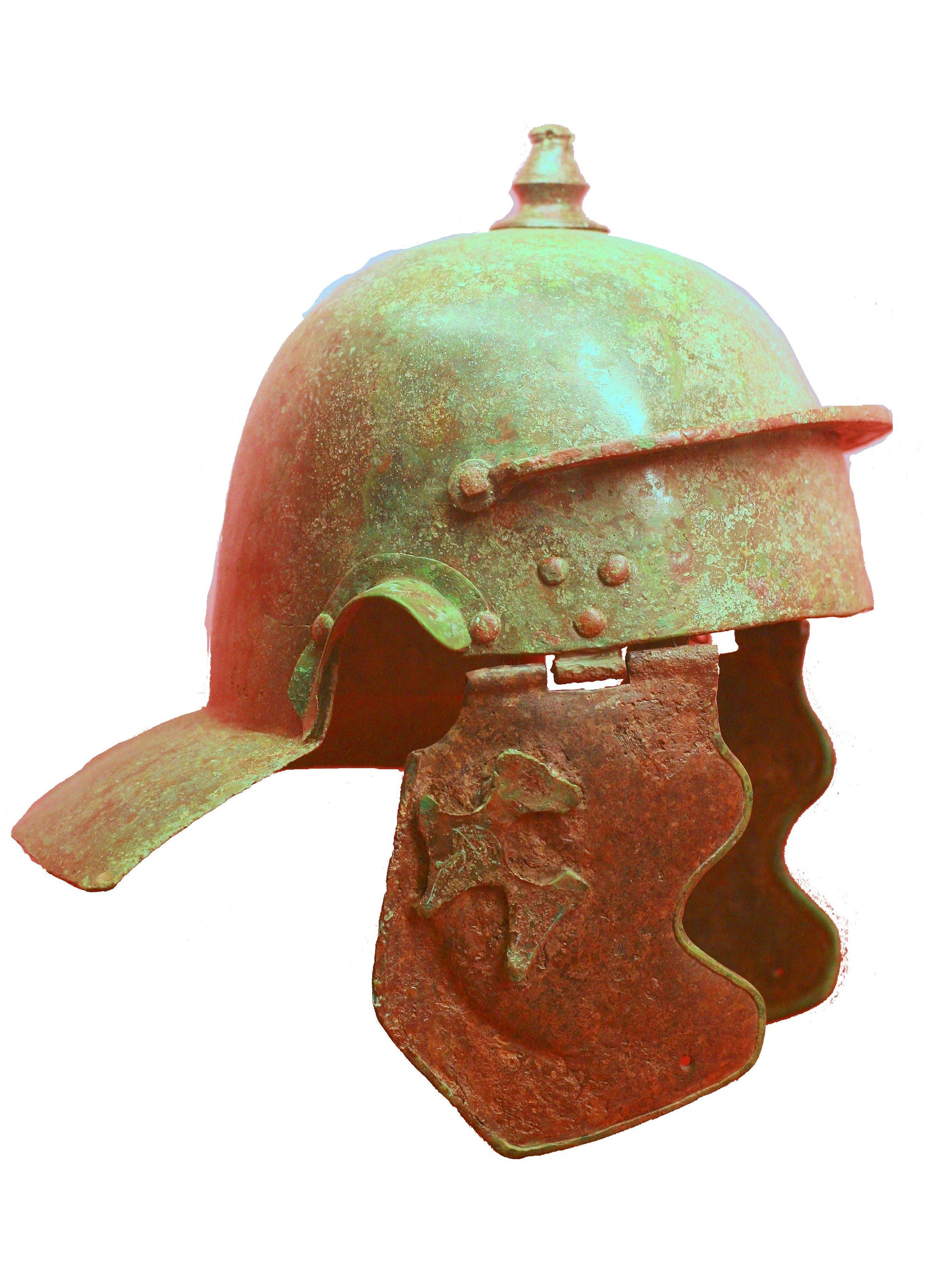
- Roman infantry helmet (late 1st century)
- Active: early 1st century to at least early 3rd century
- Country: Roman Empire
- Type: Roman auxiliary cohort
- Role: infantry/cavalry
- Size: 600 men (480 infantry, 120 cavalry)
- Garrison/HQ: 60 Illyricum; 84-223 Pannonia Superior

Cohors secunda Alpinorum equitata ("2nd part-mounted Cohort of Alpini") was a Roman auxiliary (non-citizen) mixed infantry and cavalry regiment. Alpini was a generic name denoting several Celtic-speaking mountain tribes inhabiting the Alps between Italy and Gaul, which were organised as the Tres Alpes provinces.

The regiment was probably raised as one of 4–6 Alpini units recruited after the final annexation of the western Alpine regions by emperor Augustus in 15 BC. It first appears in the datable epigraphic record in Illyricum in 60 AD. Not later than 84 it was stationed in Pannonia, though inscriptions at Colonia Agrippina (Cologne) in Germania Inferior suggest that it had a brief sojourn there in between Illyricum and Pannonia. In c. 107, when Pannonia was split in two, the regiment remained in Pannonia Superior. It was still in that province at the time of its last datable inscription (223–35). The regiment's inscriptions have been found at the following Roman forts (in likely order of occupation): Mursa; Colonia Agrippina (Germania); Baratsföldpuszta; Dunaubogdány (185 and 223).

The names of three praefecti (regimental commanders) are preserved. Only one has a certain origin, Aulus Plautius Bassianus from the city of Rome. A vexillarius (regimental standard-bearer) is recorded as of the Dalmatae Illyrian tribe and a tubicen (trumpeter) of unknown origin. The names of 5 caligati (common soldiers) are extant, all of unknown origin.

== See also ==
- List of Roman auxiliary regiments
