= Cohors I Alpinorum peditata =

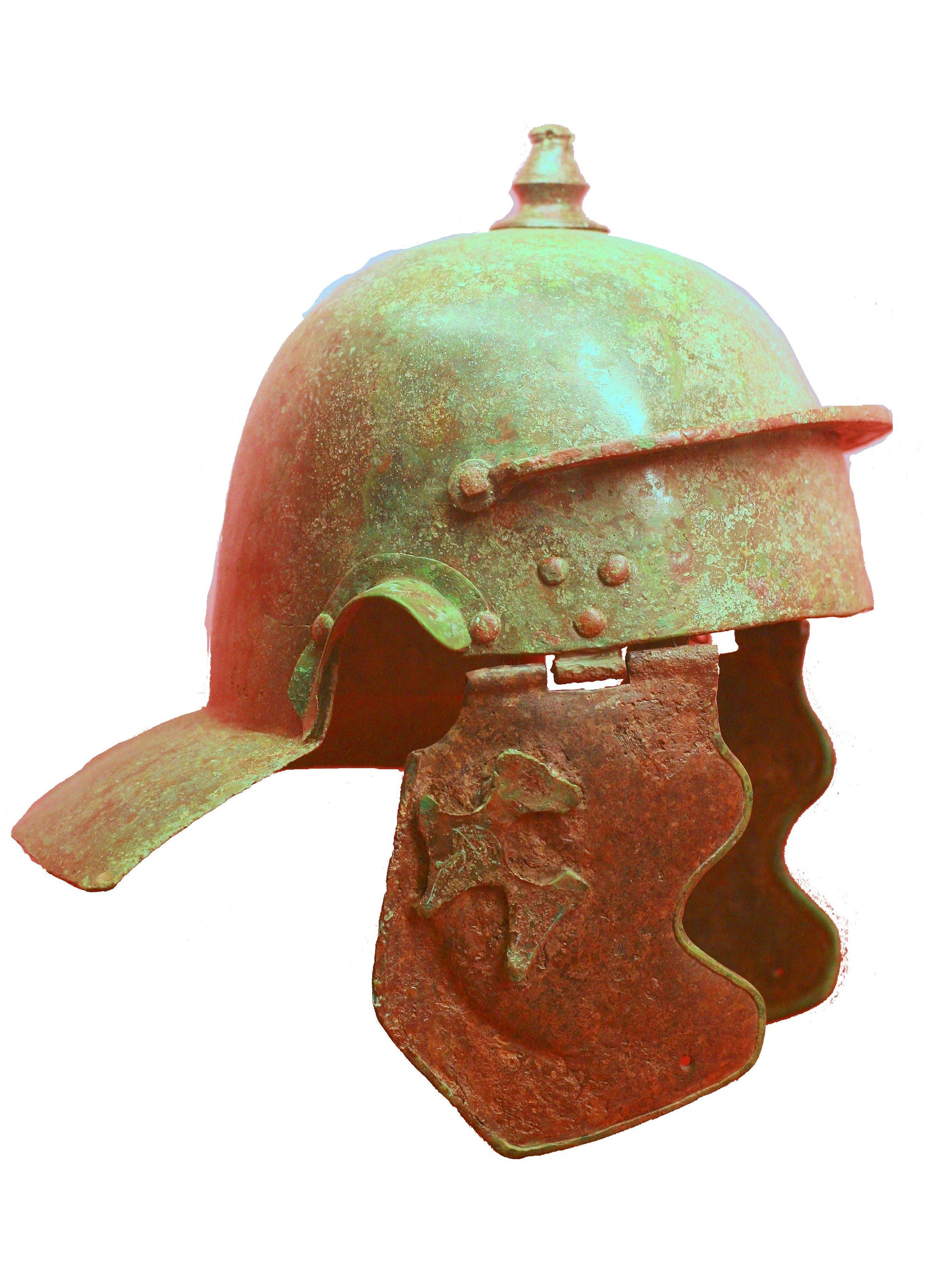
- Roman infantry helmet (late 1st century)
- Active: early 1st century to at least early 3rd century
- Country: Roman Empire
- Type: Roman auxiliary cohort
- Role: infantry
- Size: 480 men
- Garrison/HQ: 80–102 Pannonia; 135–167 Pannonia Inferior; c. 179 Dacia Inferior; to at least 210 Pannonia Inf

Cohors prima Alpinorum peditata ("1st infantry Cohort of Alpini") was a Roman auxiliary infantry regiment. It was probably raised as one of 4–6 Alpini regiments recruited after the final annexation of the western Alpine regions by emperor Augustus in 15 BC. Alpini was a generic name covering several Celtic-speaking mountain tribes inhabiting the Alps between Italy and Gaul, which were organised as the Tres Alpes provinces. It was originally stationed either on the Rhine or in Illyricum.

The regiment is first attested in the epigraphic record in 80 AD, when it was stationed in Pannonia (W Hungary/Slovenia). After Pannonia was split in c. 107 into two provinces, I Alpinorum ped. is attested in Pannonia Inferior until at least 167. In 179 it is attested in Dacia Superior. It is believed to have been stationed in Pannonia in the early 3rd century (from a tile-stamp dated c. 210).

In terms of forts, one theory has the regiment stationed in Poetovio (Ptuj, Slovenia) in the Flavian period (69–96) and then moving to Carnuntum with Legio XIV Gemina. After 107, it supposedly moved to Lussonium and after 167 to Mursa. But this sequence is disputed, as the regiment's tile stamp has been found in Arnsburg in the Taunus region in Germania Libera (Germany outside the empire).

Attested personnel is scarce. A praefectus (regimental commander) called Titus Popilius and two of his principales (junior officers) set up a dedicatory stone in S. Maria in Pantano (Central Italy). A centurion called Cerealis son of Plada restored an altar in Bescarzi in the Val Camonica (Lombardia, N. Italy), most likely his native region.

The title peditata, rarely used, was given presumably to distinguish the regiment from Cohors I Alpinorum equitata, which was serving in Pannonia at the same time. The most likely reason for these two regiments carrying the same name and number is that they were raised as part of two separate series.

The modern Italian Army still today contains crack regiments called Alpini.

== See also ==
- Alpinorum auxiliary regiments
- List of Roman auxiliary regiments
