= Cohors V Delmatarum c.R. =

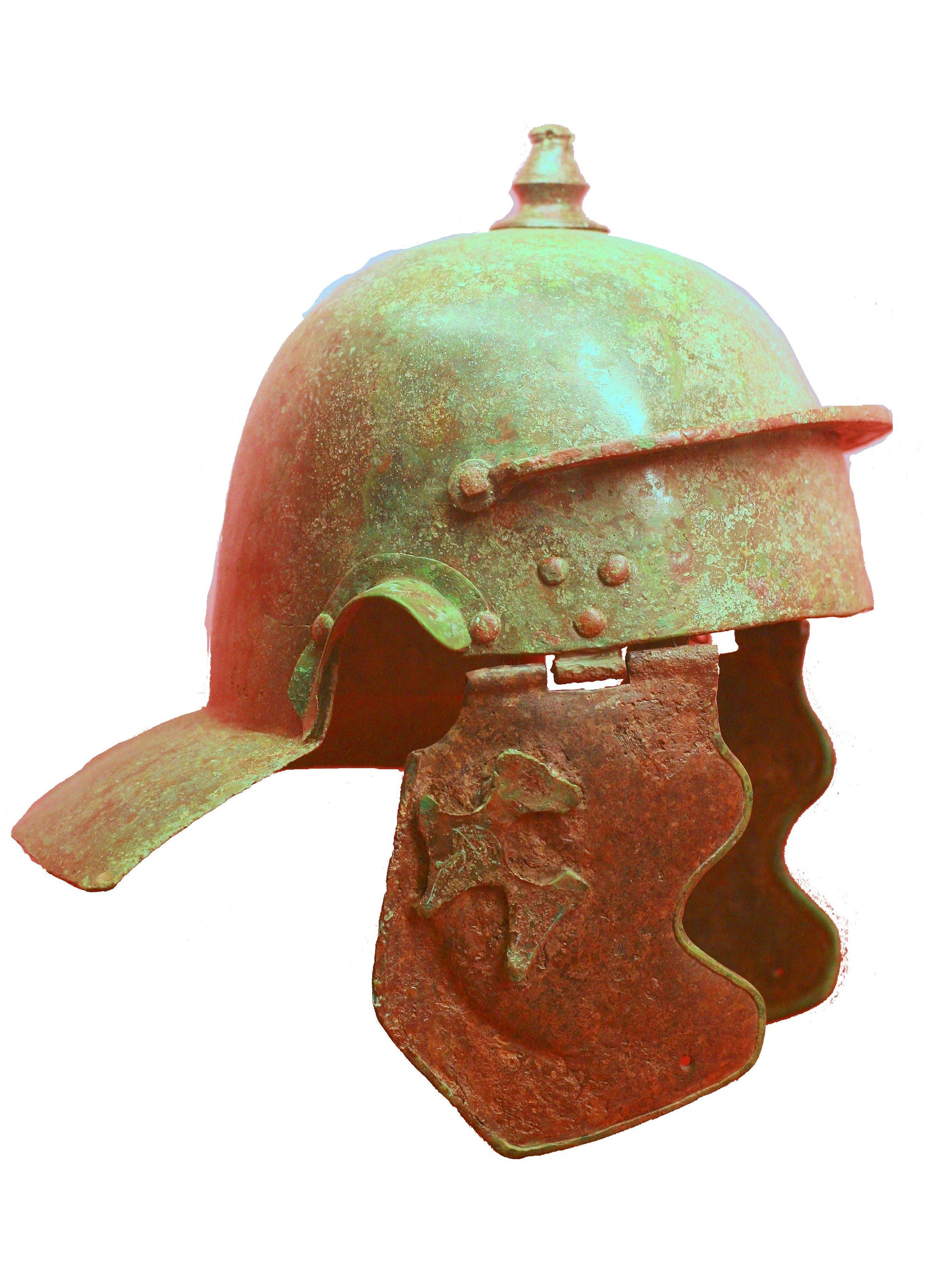
- Roman infantry helmet (late 1st century)
- Active: AD 14 until at least 158
- Country: Roman Empire
- Type: Roman auxiliary cohort
- Role: infantry
- Size: 480 men
- Garrison/HQ: Mauretania Tingitana 88–158

Cohors quinta Delmatarum civium Romanorum ("5th Cohort of Dalmatae Roman citizens") was a Roman auxiliary infantry regiment. It is named after the Dalmatae (or Delmatae), an Illyrian-speaking tribe that inhabited the Adriatic coastal mountain range of the eponymous Dalmatia. The ancient geographer Strabo describes these mountains as extremely rugged, and the Dalmatae as backward and warlike. He claims that they did not use money long after their neighbours adopted it and that they "made war on the Romans for a long time". He also criticises the Dalmatae, a nation of pastoralists, for turning fertile plains into sheep pasture. Indeed, the name of the tribe itself is believed to mean "shepherds", derived from the Illyrian word delme ("sheep"). The final time this people fought against Rome was in the Illyrian revolt of AD 6–9. The revolt was started by Dalmatae auxiliary forces and soon spread all over Dalmatia and Pannonia. The resulting war was described by the Roman writer Suetonius as the most difficult faced by Rome since the Punic Wars two centuries earlier. But after the war, the Dalmatae became a loyal and important source of recruits for the Roman army.

According to Holder, a total of 12 cohortes Delmatarum appear to have been raised after the suppression of the Illyrian revolt in two series, of 7 and 5 respectively. All these units were in existence by the time of emperor Claudius (r. 41-54) Of these, 9 appear to have survived into the 2nd century.

The regiment was probably raised by founder-emperor Augustus (r. 30 BC - AD 14) after 9 AD. It was certainly in existence by the time of Claudius (r. 41-54). It is unclear why two cohortes Delmatarum were given the same number V: this regiment and another V Delmatarum in Germania Superior). Spaul suggests the regiment in Mauretania may be the cohors I Liburnorum, renamed. The regiment first appears in the datable epigraphic record in AD 88 in Mauretania Tingitana. It was still there in 158, the time of its last datable inscription.

Apart from diplomas, there is no epigraphic evidence for this unit. The regiment's title c.R. first appears in a diploma of 122. The honorific title civium Romanorum (c.R. for short) was normally awarded by the emperor for valour to an auxiliary regiment as a whole. The award would include the grant of Roman citizenship to all the regiment's men, but not to subsequent recruits to the regiment. The regiment, however, would retain the prestigious title in perpetuity. (N.B. Until 212, only a minority of the empire's inhabitants (inc. all Italians) held full Roman citizenship. The rest were denoted peregrini, a second-class status. Since the legions admitted only citizens, peregrini could only enlist in the auxilia. Citizenship carried a number of tax and other privileges and was highly sought after. It could be earned by serving in the auxilia for the minimum 25-year term.

== See also ==
- List of Roman auxiliary regiments
