= Cohors I Hispanorum pia fidelis =

Cohors I Hispanorum quingenaria peditata pia fidelis
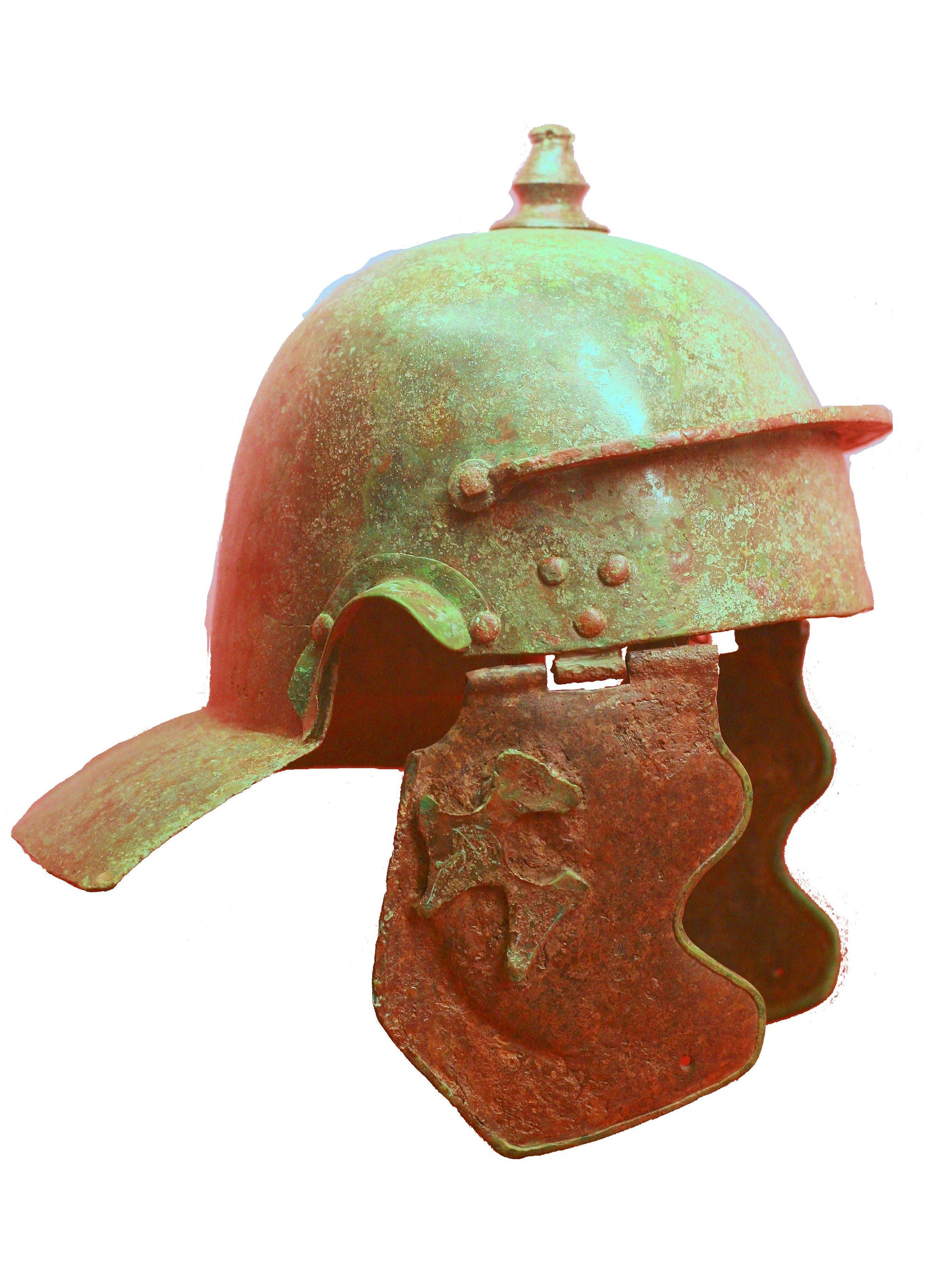
- Roman infantry helmet (late 1st century)
- Active: ?
- Country: Roman Empire
- Type: Roman auxiliary cohort
- Role: infantry
- Size: 480 men (480 infantry)

Cohors [prima] Hispanorum [quingenaria peditata] pia fidelis ("[1st infantry 500 strong] cohort of Hispani, dutiful and loyal") was a Roman auxiliary infantry regiment. The cohort was stationed in Dacia at castra Largiana.

== See also ==
- Cohors I Flavia Ulpia Hispanorum miliaria eq c.R.
- List of Roman auxiliary regiments
