= Cohors I Aelia Gaesatorum milliaria sagitt =

Cohors I Aelia Gaesatorum milliaria peditata sagittaria
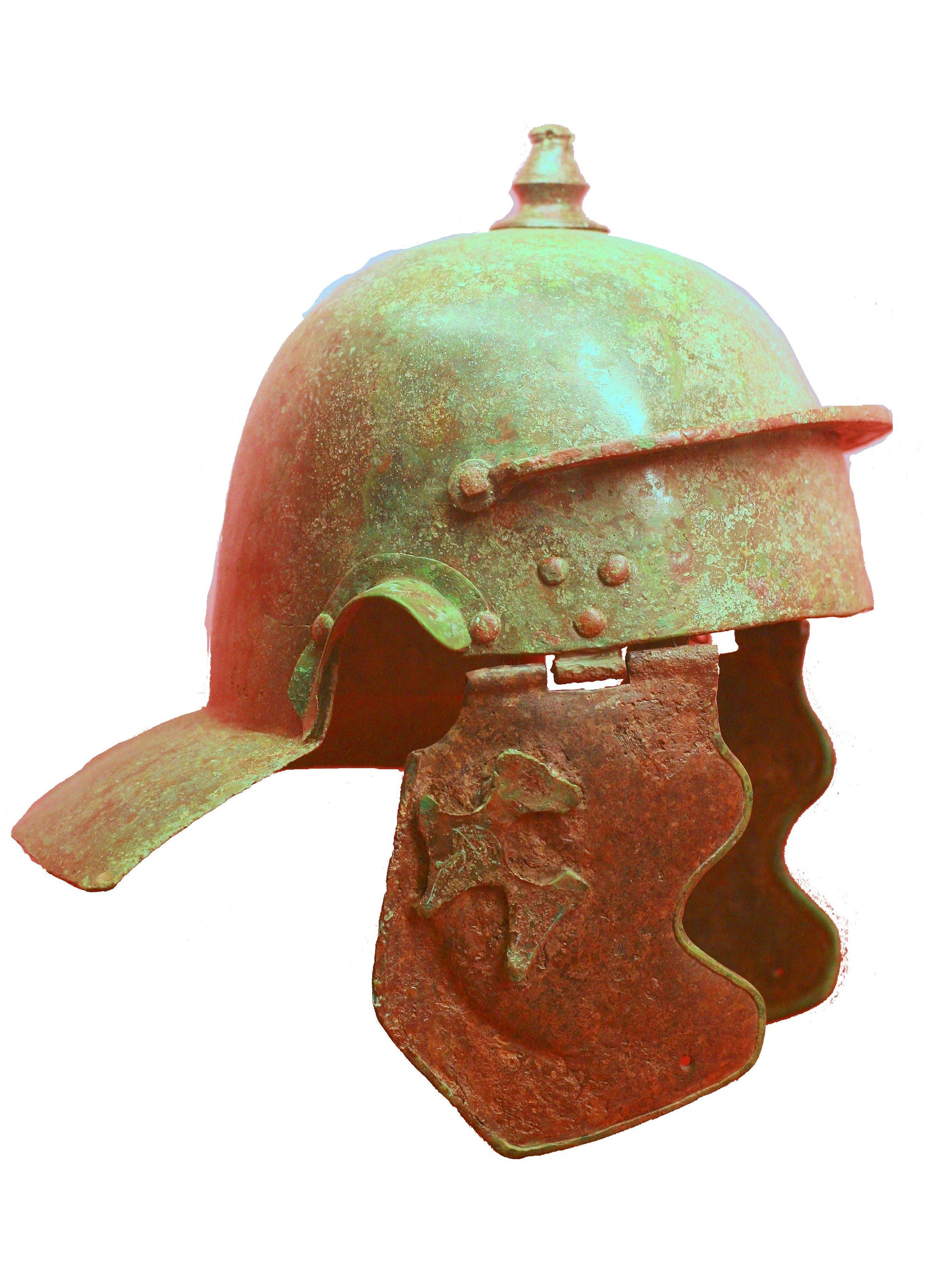
- Roman infantry helmet (late 1st century)
- Active: Second Century CE
- Country: Roman Empire
- Type: Roman auxiliary cohort
- Role: infantry
- Size: 400-600

Cohors [prima] Aelia Gaesatorum milliaria [peditata] sagittaria ("[1st infantry 1000 strong] archer Aelian cohort of Gaesati") was a Roman auxiliary infantry regiment. The cohort stationed in Dacia, at castrum Resculum, and in Pannonia.

== See also ==
- Roman auxiliaries
- List of Roman auxiliary regiments
