= Pia Fidelis =

Cognomen of several Roman legions

Pia Fidelis, Latin feminine form for "pious and faithful", was the cognomen of several Roman legions, awarded by an emperor when the legion had proved "devoted and loyal". Some legions received this honour several times, and their name included the number of awards. Awards were made from 42 AD (when it was awarded by Claudius to the VII and IX legions) until the end of the second century AD. It was awarded in total to 10 legions and around 50 auxilia cohorts.

- Legio I Adiutrix Pia Fidelis Bis ("twice loyal and faithful")
- I Minervia Pia Fidelis Domitiana ("loyal and faithful to Domitian")
- II Adiutrix
- III Italica VII Pia VII Fidelis ("seven times faithful and loyal")
- V Macedonica VII Pia VII Fidelis
- VII Claudia VII Pia VII Fidelis ("seven times faithful and loyal")
- X Gemina Pia Fidelis Domitiana ("faithful and loyal to Domitian")
- XI Claudia Pia VI Fidelis VI ("six times faithful and loyal")
