= Cohors I Alpinorum equitata =

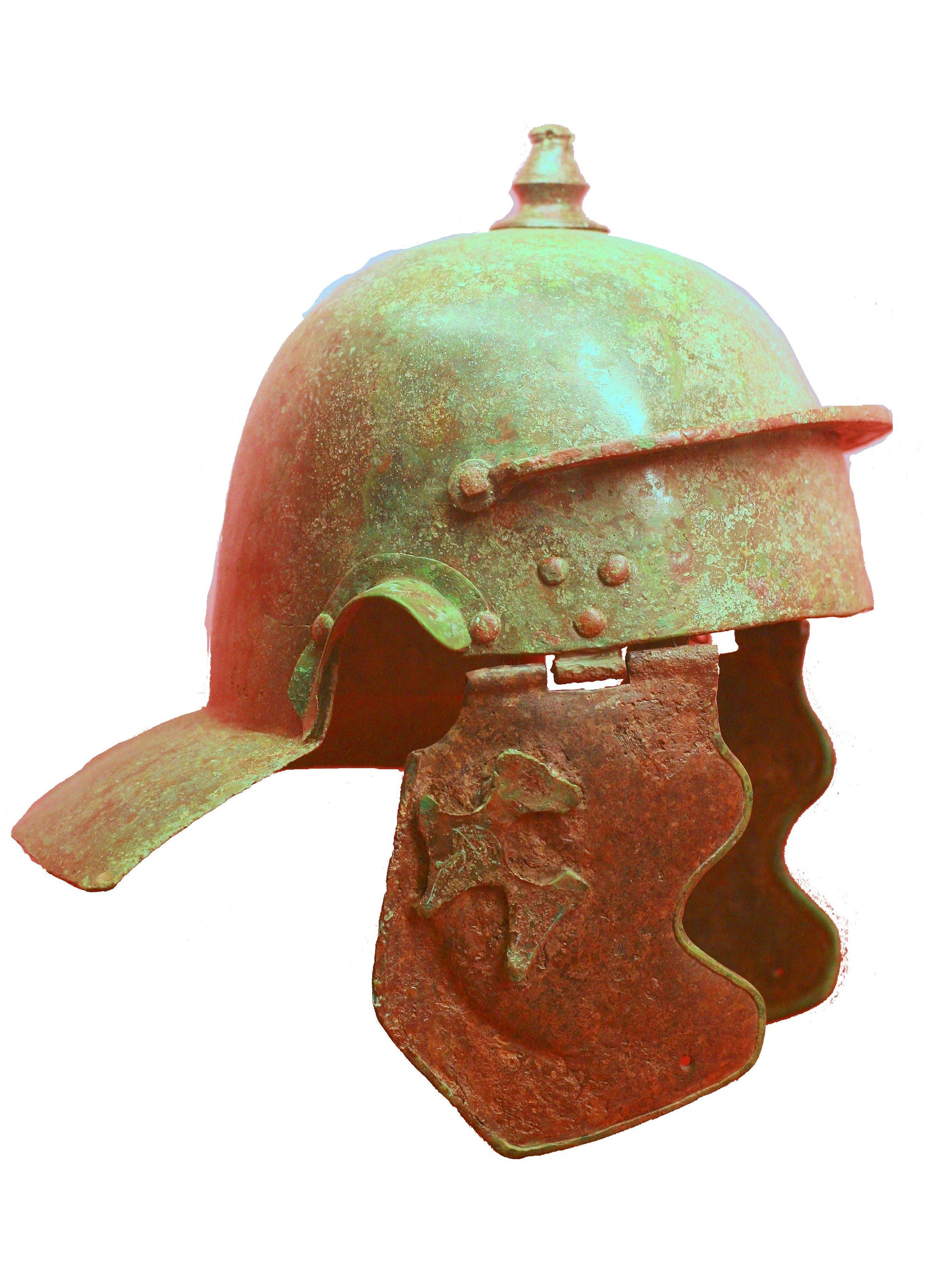
- Roman infantry helmet (late 1st century)
- Active: early 1st century to at least early 3rd century
- Country: Roman Empire
- Type: Roman auxiliary cohort
- Role: infantry/cavalry
- Size: 600 men (480 infantry, 120 cavalry)
- Garrison/HQ: before 80 Illyricum; 80-5 Pannonia Inferior; 60-70 Aquitania; 103 Britannia; 110-43 Pannonia Inferior; 144 Dacia Superior; 148-215 Pannonia Inferior

Cohors prima Alpinorum equitata ("1st part-mounted Cohort of Alpini") was a Roman auxiliary mixed infantry and cavalry regiment.

== History ==
Alpini was a generic name denoting several Celtic-speaking mountain tribes inhabiting the Alps between Italy and Gaul, which were organised as the Tres Alpes provinces. The regiment was probably raised as one of 4–6 Alpini units recruited after the final annexation of the western Alpine regions by emperor Augustus in 15 BC.

It was originally stationed in Illyricum, where it is recorded in 60 AD. Not later than 80, it was based in Pannonia, later Pannonia Inferior after Pannonia was divided in two c. 107. It was still in that province c. 215, according to its last datable inscription. There were three brief interruptions to the regiment's sojourn in Pannonia. It is recorded first in Aquitania in 60–70 (Excisum, Villeneuve-sur-Lot) from recent finds of military equipments (confirming tombstones inscriptions; secondly, in Britannia in 103, but cannot have stayed longer than 85–110, and probably less; thirdly, it is recorded in Dacia Superior in 144, but cannot have remained longer than five years. The regiment's inscriptions have been found in the following Roman forts (in likely order of occupation): Carnuntum; Matrica (Százhalombatta); Excisum; Apulum (Dacia); Mursa (c. 215); Lussonium (Dunakömlőd).

The names of seven praefecti (regimental commanders) have been preserved, but none of their origins are certain. One erected a votive altar at Thuburbo Maius (Tunisia), while another at Caesarea, so these may be their respective home towns. Senior officers attested are four centuriones (infantry officers) and 1 decurio (cavalry officers). One junior officer (optio) is known. An eques (common cavalryman) with the title "buc." is attested: this probably stands for buccinator ("bugler"). Caligati (common soldiers) attested are 3 foot soldiers and one eques. Only the latter of all the personnel has a certain origin: he is denoted a member of the Eravisci, a Pannonian tribe.

== See also ==
- Alpinorum auxiliary regiments
- List of Roman auxiliary regiments
