= Sarmizegetusa =

Sarmizegetusa may refer to several places in present-day Romania:

- Sarmizegetusa Regia, the former Dacian capital
  - Battle of Sarmizegetusa, a siege of Sarmizegetusa, the capital of Dacia, fought in 106
- Sarmizegetusa Ulpia Traiana, the former capital of Roman Dacia
- Sarmizegetusa, Hunedoara, a modern-day commune
