= Ulpia Traiana Sarmizegetusa =

Ancient Roman city in Dacia

Colonia Dacica Sarmizegetusa
- Colonia Dacica Sarmizegetusa, Zarmizegethusa
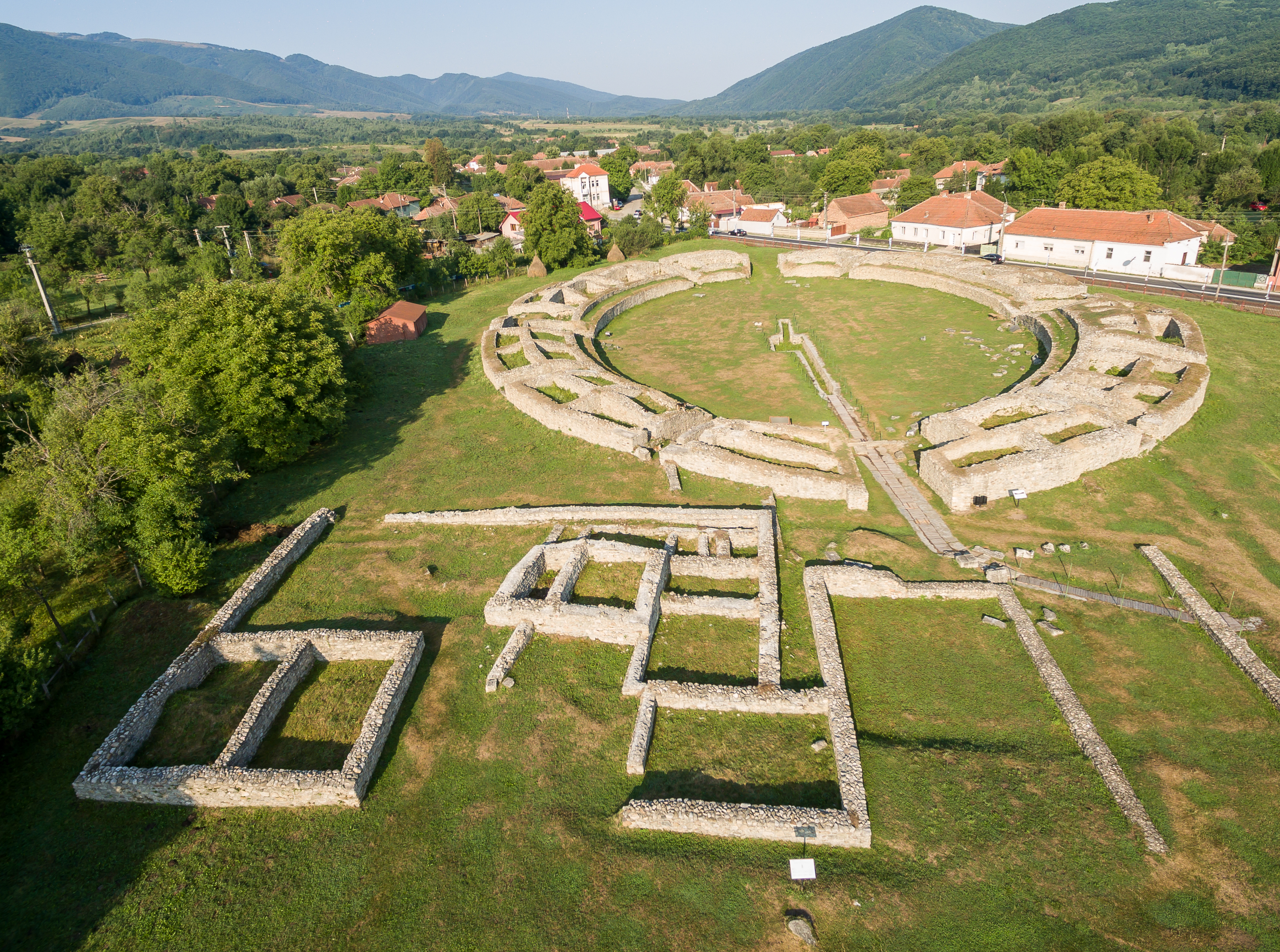

- Location within Romania
- 45.5130°N 22.7873°E
- Location: Sarmizegetusa, Hunedoara, Romania

History
- Founded: 2nd century AD
- Built: Trajan

Site notes
- Elevation: 500 m (1,600 ft)
- Condition: Ruined

Ulpia Traiana Augusta Dacica Sarmizegetusa was the capital, the first, and largest city of Roman Dacia, named after Sarmizegetusa the former Dacian capital, located some 30 km away. It was founded in 106 as a colonia deducta and elevated to metropolis during the reign of Severus Alexander. The present village of Sarmizegetusa has been built over parts of it.

It acted as the seat of the governor of Roman Dacia until it was moved to Apulum around 158 under Antoninus Pius.

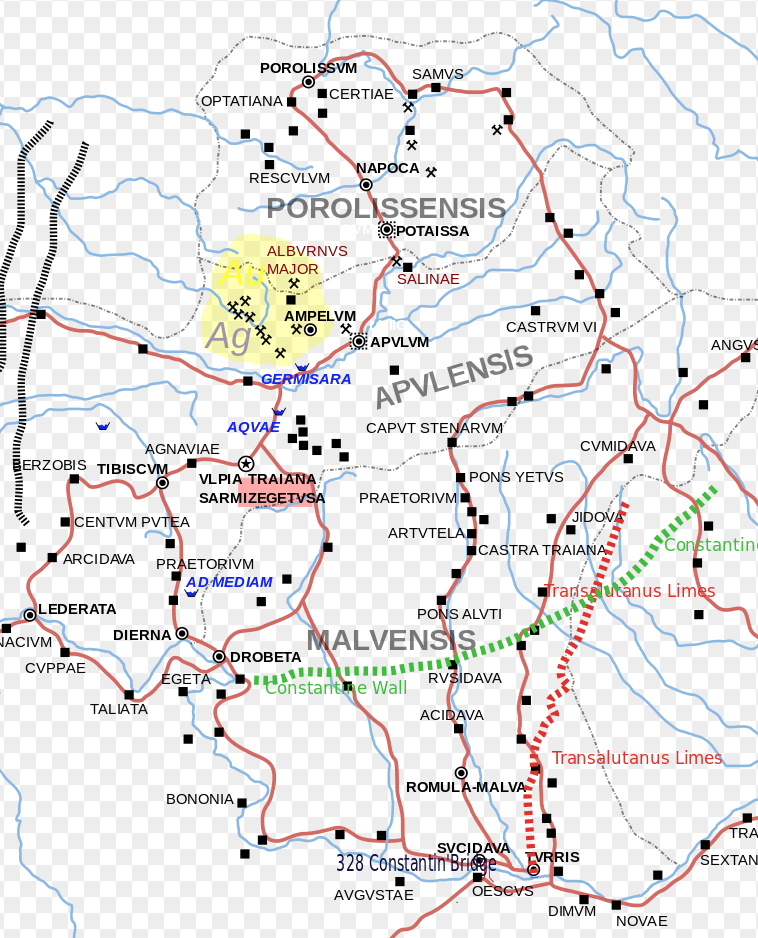
Western Dacia

== Location ==
The settlement was built at a distance of 8 km from Tapae, a pass between Banat and Transylvania (today known as the Iron Gates of Transylvania). The choice was based on the military and economic advantages given by the natural barrier represented by the Retezat Mountains in the south and Poiana Ruscă Mountains in the north. The territory of the metropolis extended from Tibiscum to Micia and to the Jiu valley, the city being protected by several castra: Tibiscum, Pons Augusti, Micia and those of Bumbești.

The city was at the crossroads of the imperial road from Drobeta that linked the north of the province with Porolissum (Moigrad) and the one starting form Dierna going towards Tibiscum.

== History ==
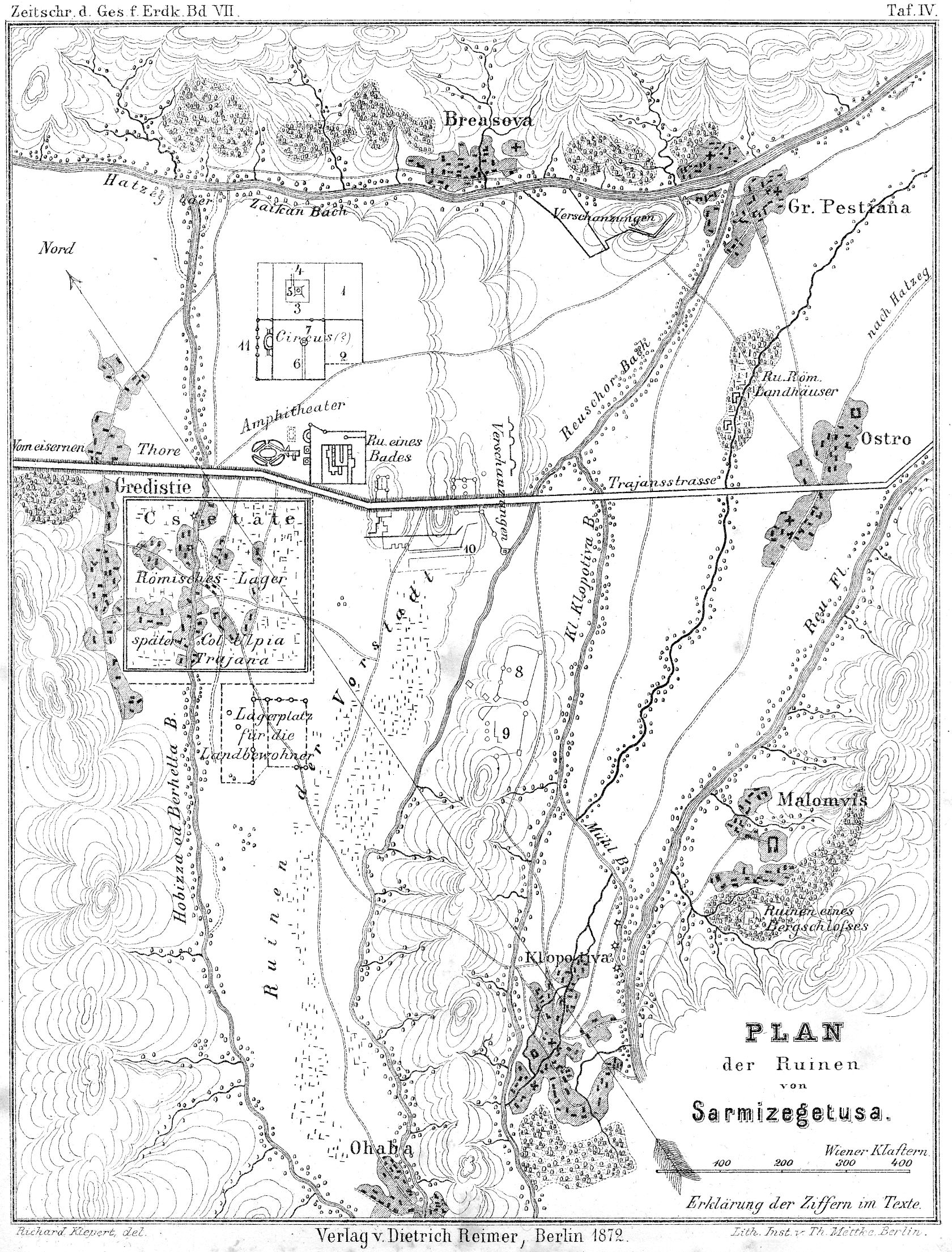
Plan of the settlement

From an inscription discovered at the beginning of the 14th century in the village of Grădişte, the new town was settled in the first years after the conquest of Dacia in 106 AD. The inscription reads: "On the command of the emperor Caesar Nerva Traianus Augustus, son of the divine Nerva, was settled the Dacian Colony by Decimus Terentius Scaurianus, its governor." In Rome, the settlement of the colony was marked by the minting of a coin, by order of the Senate, dedicated to emperor Trajan.

Possibly built over a temporary camp of the Fifth Macedonian Legion, it soon was settled by the retired veterans who had served in the Dacian Wars, principally the Fifth (Macedonia), Ninth (Claudia), and Fourteenth (Gemina) legions. It was also settled by veterans and colonists from the Italian peninsula. From the beginning it received the title of colonia and the status of ius Italicum.

During the reign of Hadrian the city was renamed Colonia Ulpia Traiana Augusta Dacica Sarmizegetusa. The name was found on a stone inscription that reads "To Gaius Arrius Quadratus, son of Gaius, acting praetor of the emperor in Colonia Ulpia Traiana Augusta Dacica Sarmizegetusa." Gaius Arrius Antoninus bore the title legatus pro praetore, the official title of the governor of some imperial provinces of the Roman Empire.

Between 222 and 235 the colony was called a metropolis.

After the abandonment of Dacia, the population reduced drastically. A small community moved inside the amphitheatre, walling the entrances with funerary stones and surviving until the end of the 4th century.

== The city ==
The urban centre and the civil settlement occupied an area of over 130 hectares (320 acres; 0.50 sq mi), with a population reaching between 11,000 and 15,000 at the end of the 2nd century. The city was built with a Hippodamian Plan and was surrounded by strong walls over 32.4 hectares (80 acres; 0.125 sq mi).

The walled town was built with public and administrative buildings at the centre of which was the forum vetus. The entrance was marked by a tetrapylon placed at the intersection of the two main streets with each side ornated with a fountain dedicated to the nymphs. South of the forum vetus, on the place of an old market, a new forum was built around 153 with a Capitolium at its western side. Besides the temple dedicated to the Capitoline Triad, which marked the city as the religious centre of Dacia, in the beginning of the 3rd century a temple for the Palmyrene gods was dedicated. Northeast of the new forum was the building of the fiscal procurator of Dacia Apulensis.

The civil settlement continued outside the walls, mainly to the North, covering over 100 hectares. The most important building there was the amphitheatre, initially built of wood then from the second half of the 2nd century from stone. East of the amphitheatre was the sacred area with multiple temples and sanctuaries. South was a large area for Roman baths.

The city was the main residence of the Cominii family who occupied the highest civic magistracies and built public buildings.

== Archeological site ==
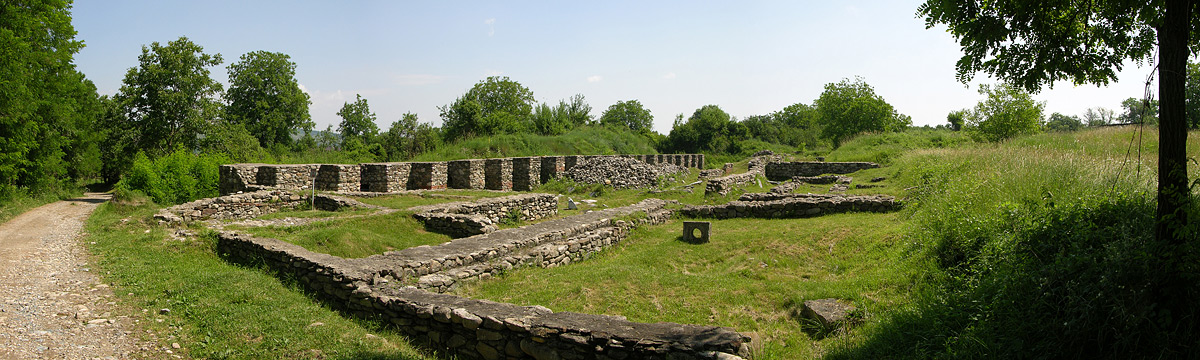
Panoramic view of Domus Procuratoris

Today, the archeological site contains the following remains:

- Amphitheatre
- Gladiator school
- Goddess Nemesis Temple
- Liber Pater Temple
- Gods Aesculapius and Hygieia Temple
- Temple Basilica
- Temple of god Mithras
- Temple of the Palmyrenes
- Great Temple
- God Silvanus Temple
- Glass blowers' workshops
- Horreum
- Financial procurator's office
- Thermae
- Forum

== Image gallery ==
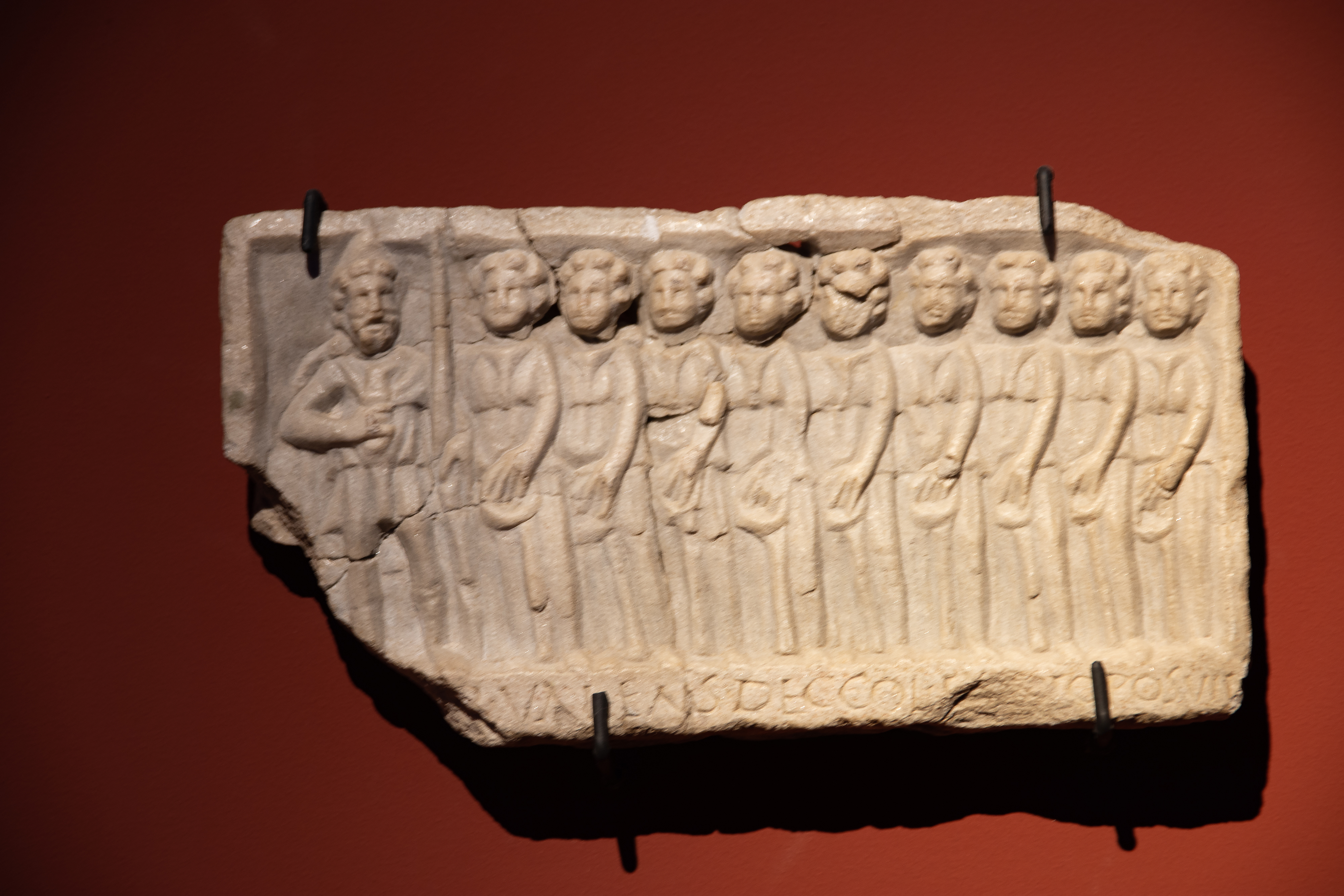
Votive plaque showing Silvanus

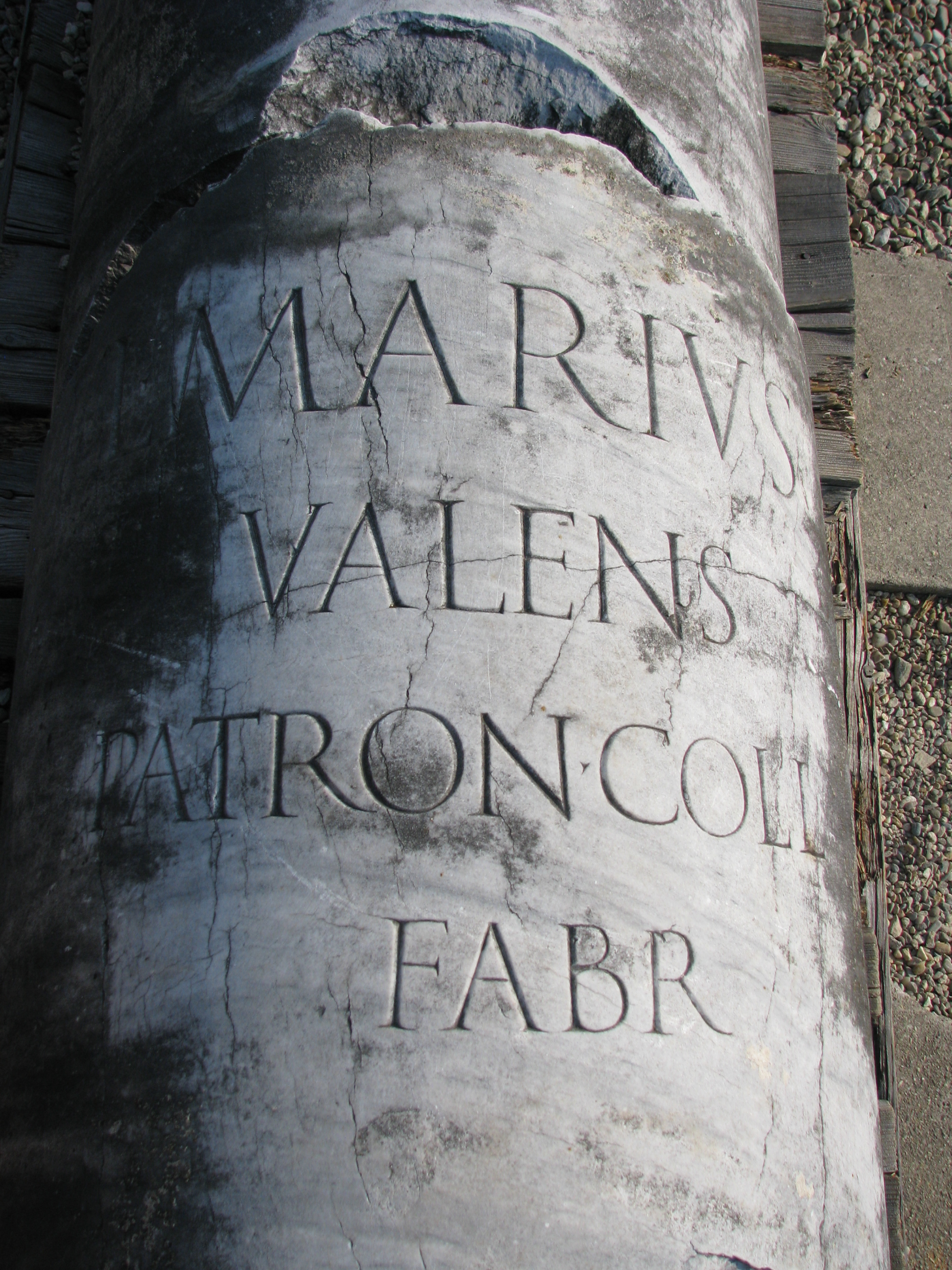
Inscription on the Forum Column

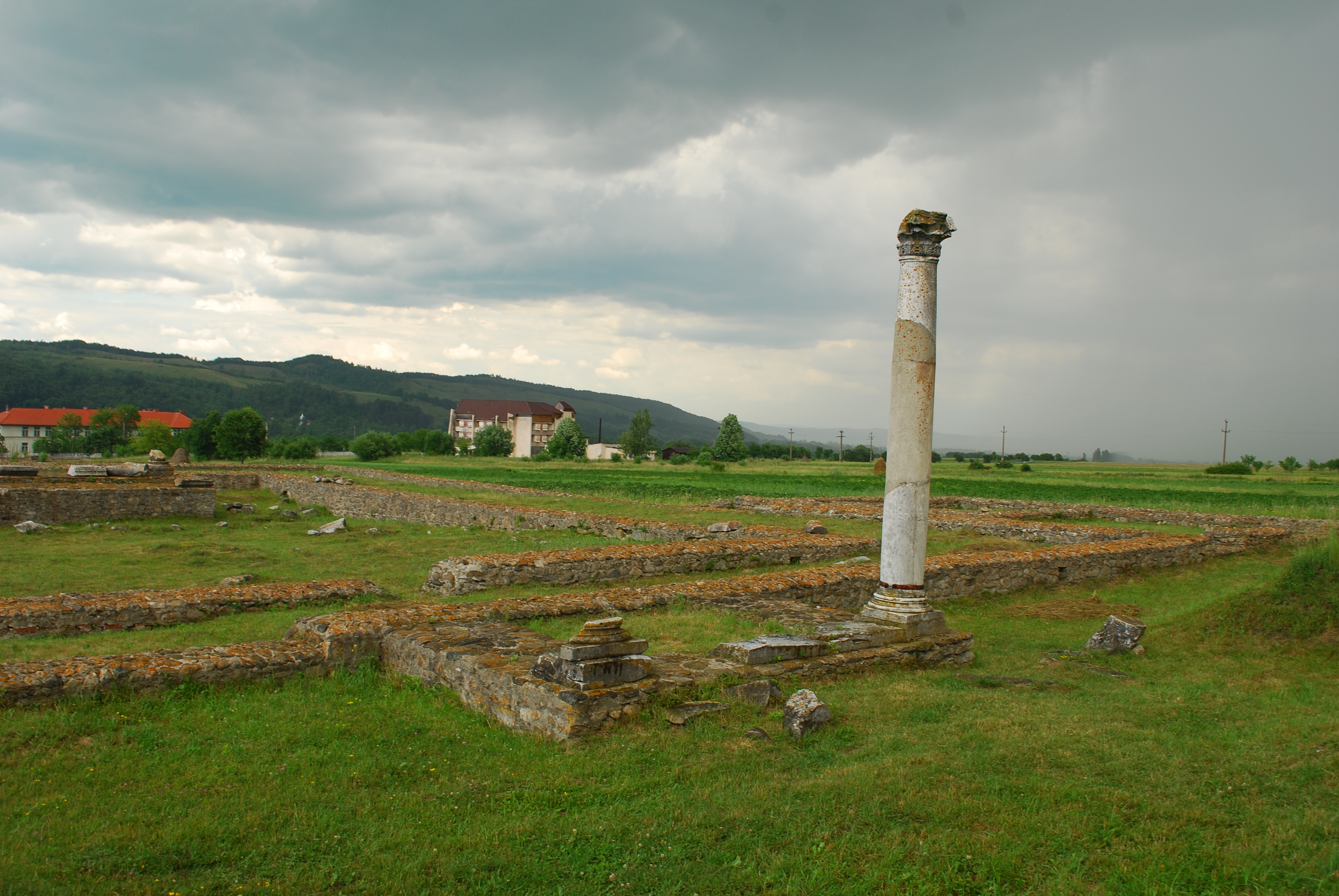
The Great Temple

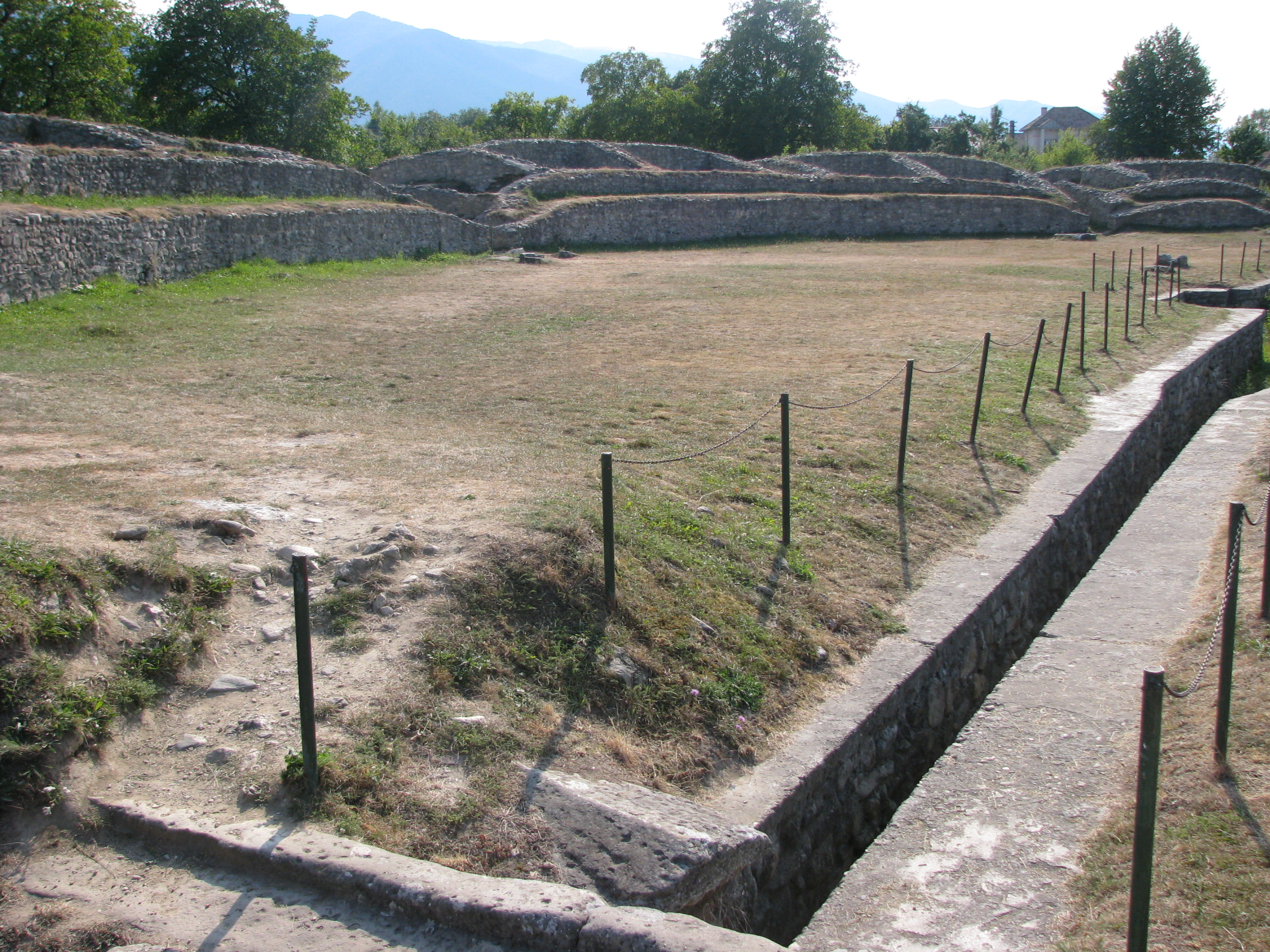
The Amphitheatre

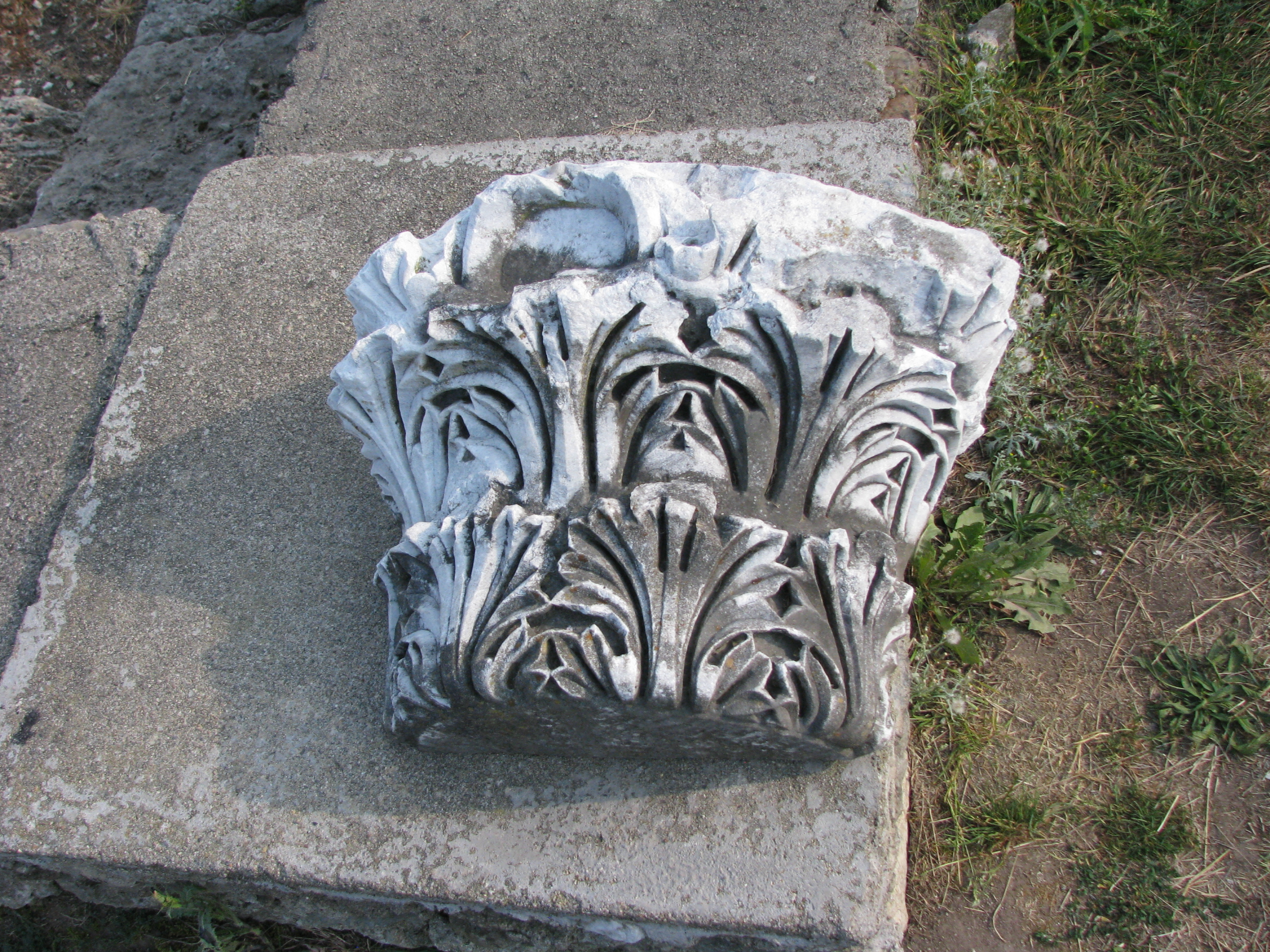
Column ornament

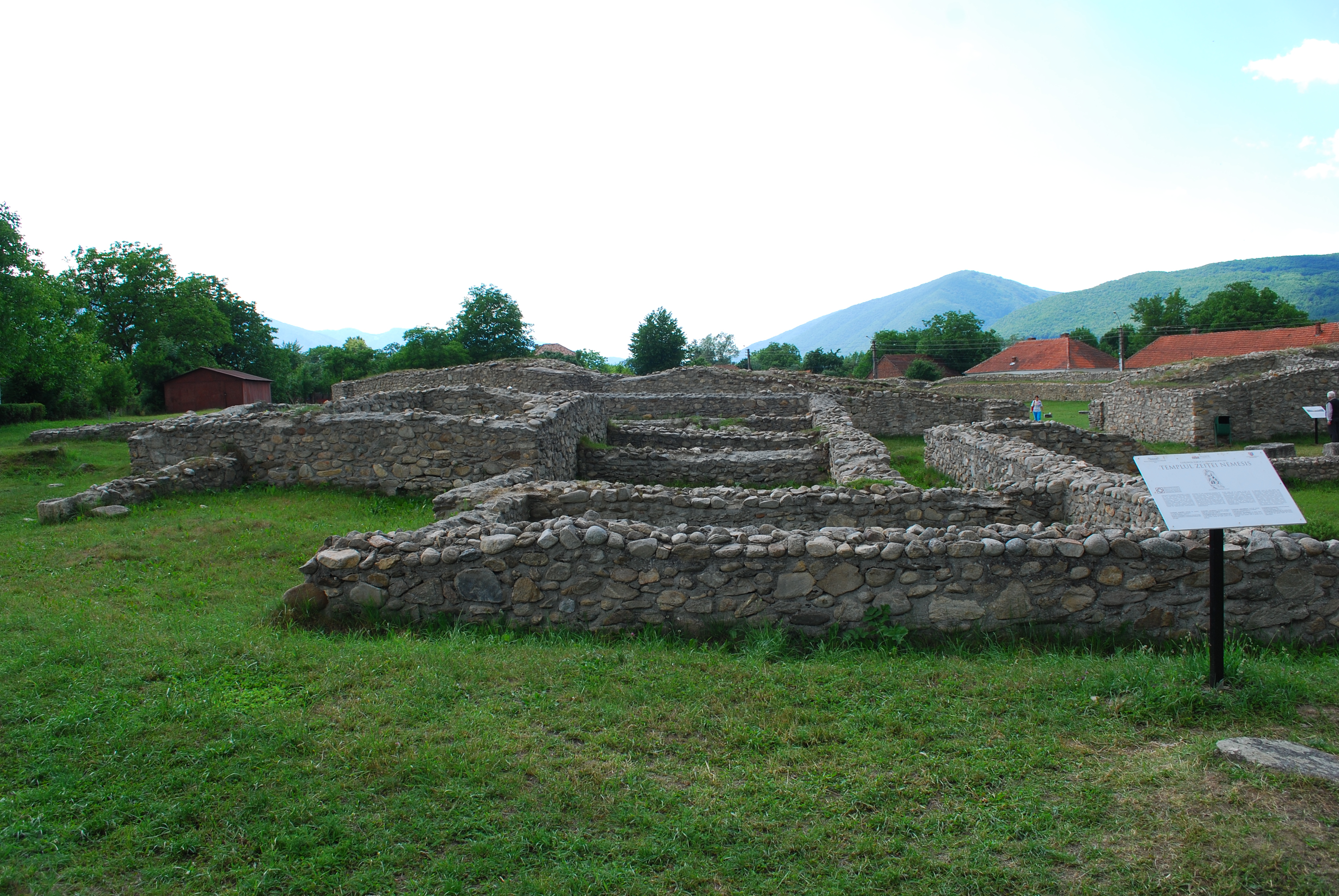
Temple of Nemesis

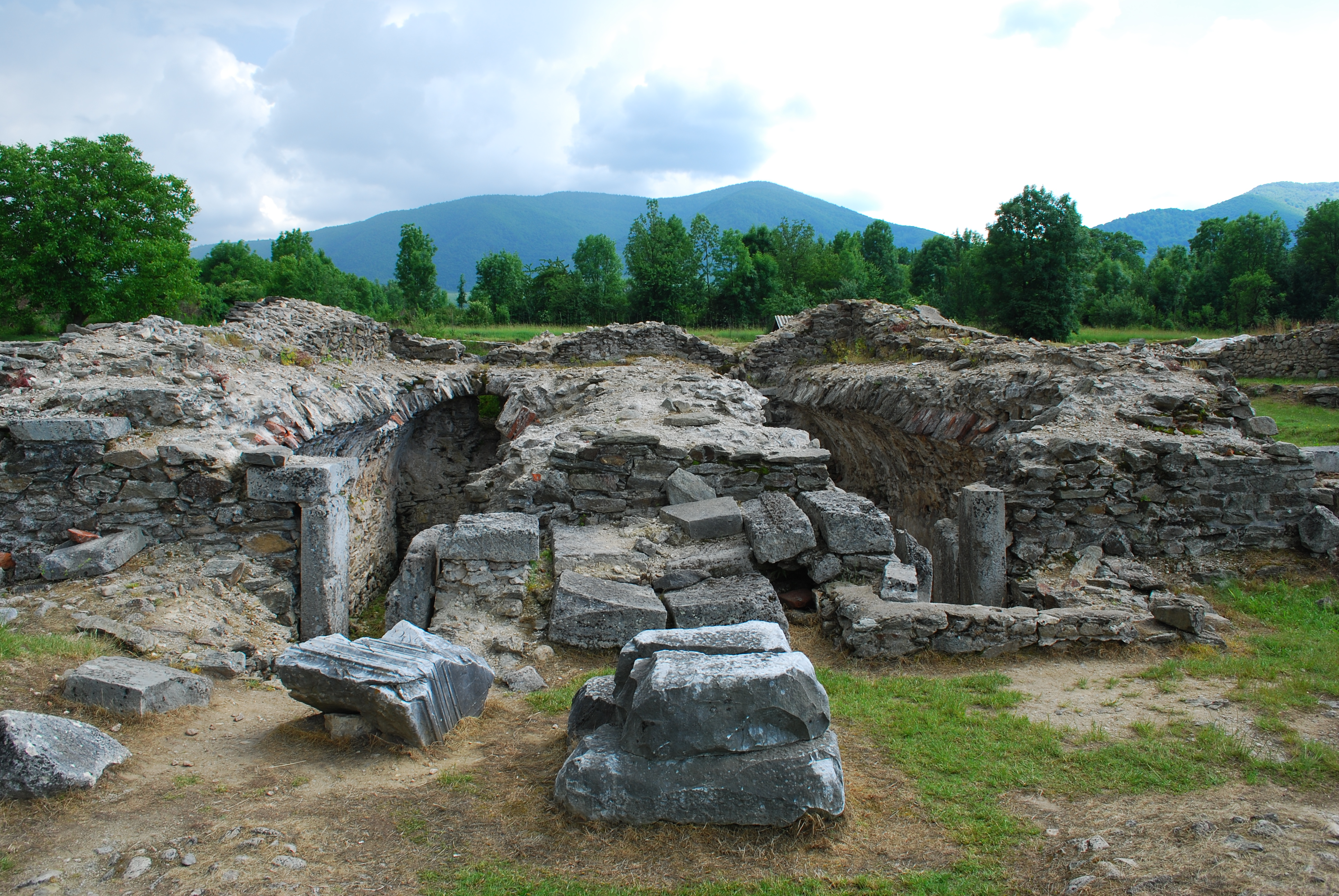
Curia

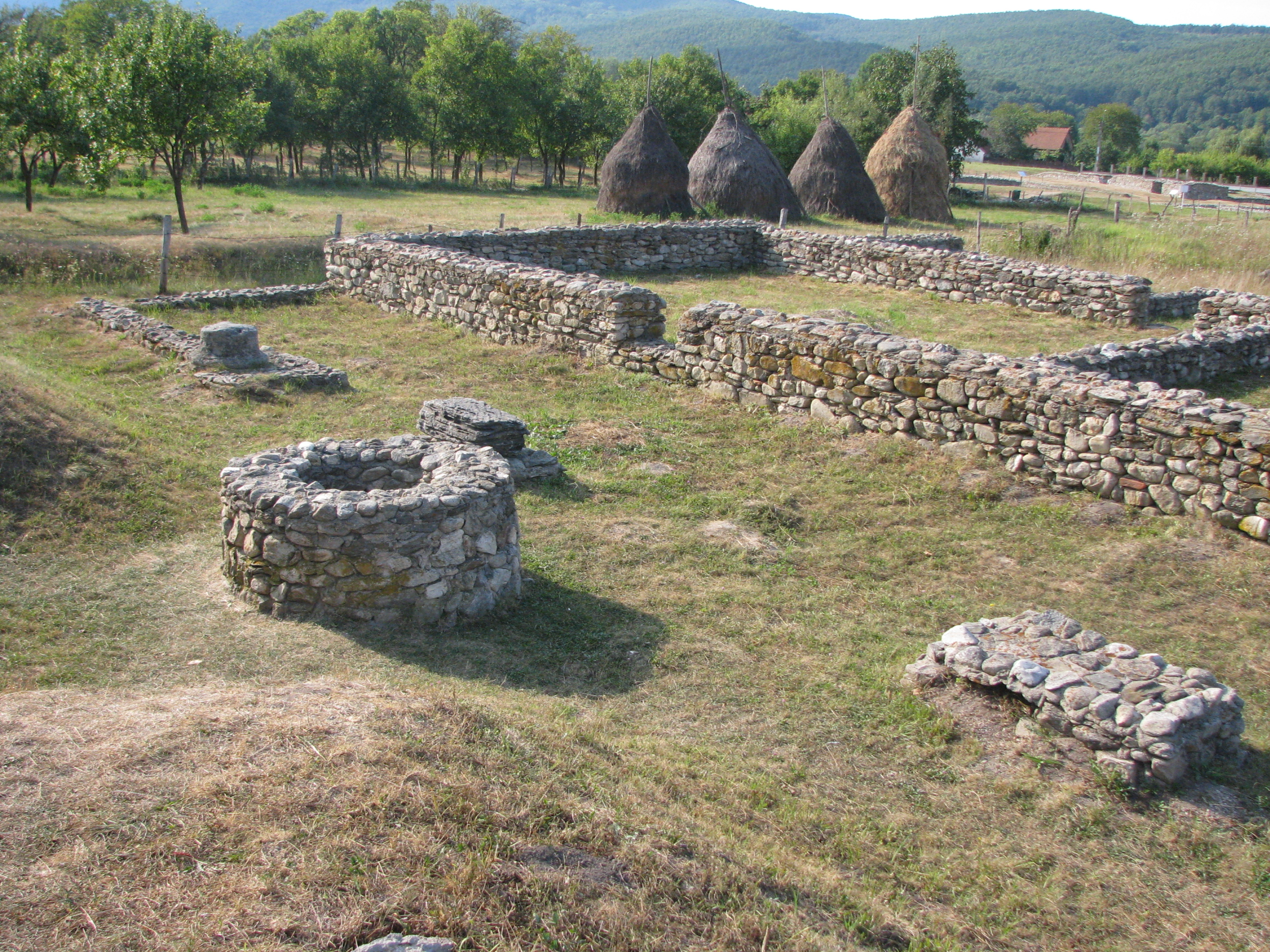
Glass workshop

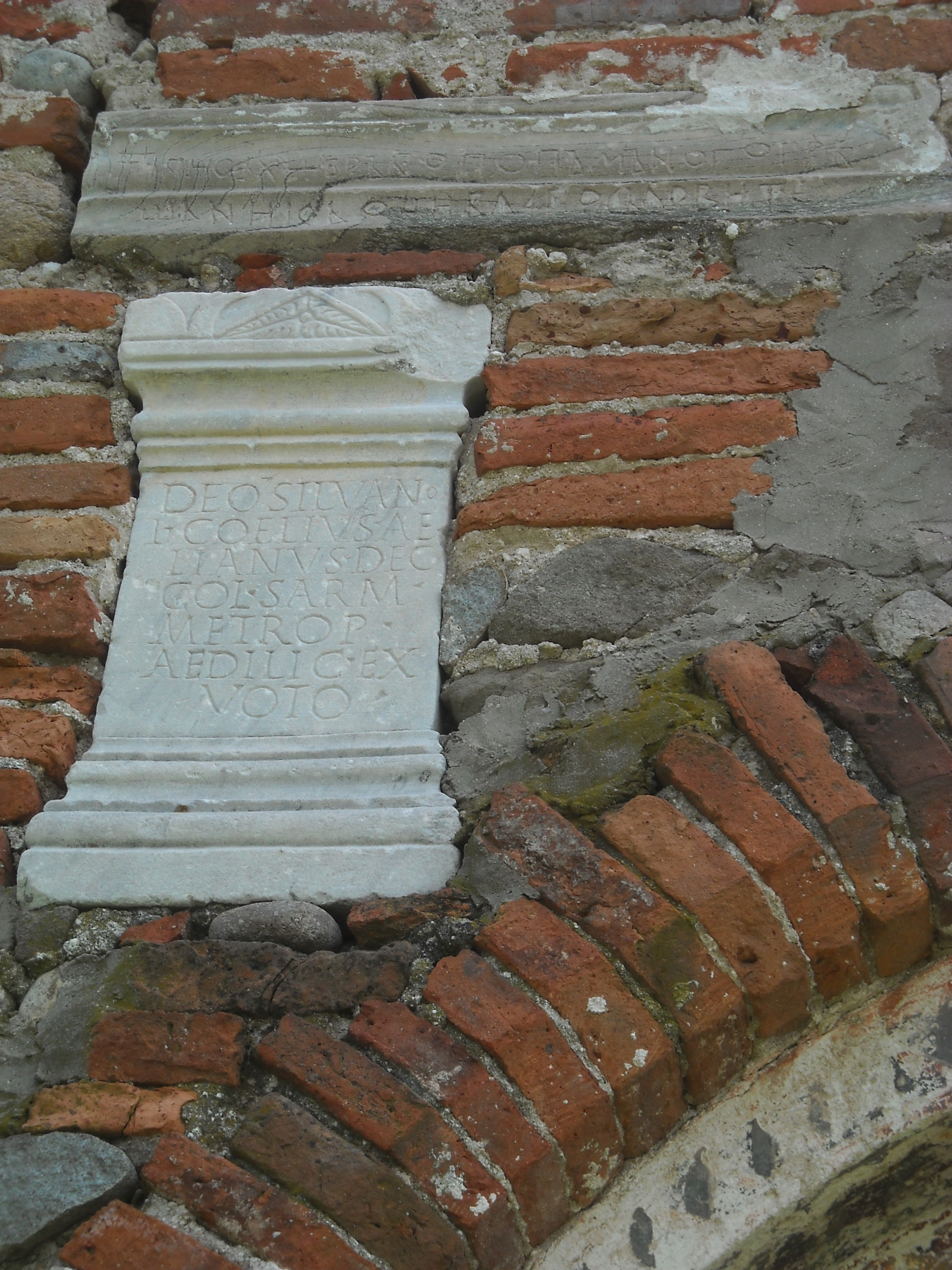
Roman tablet built into the medieval church in Sânpetru.

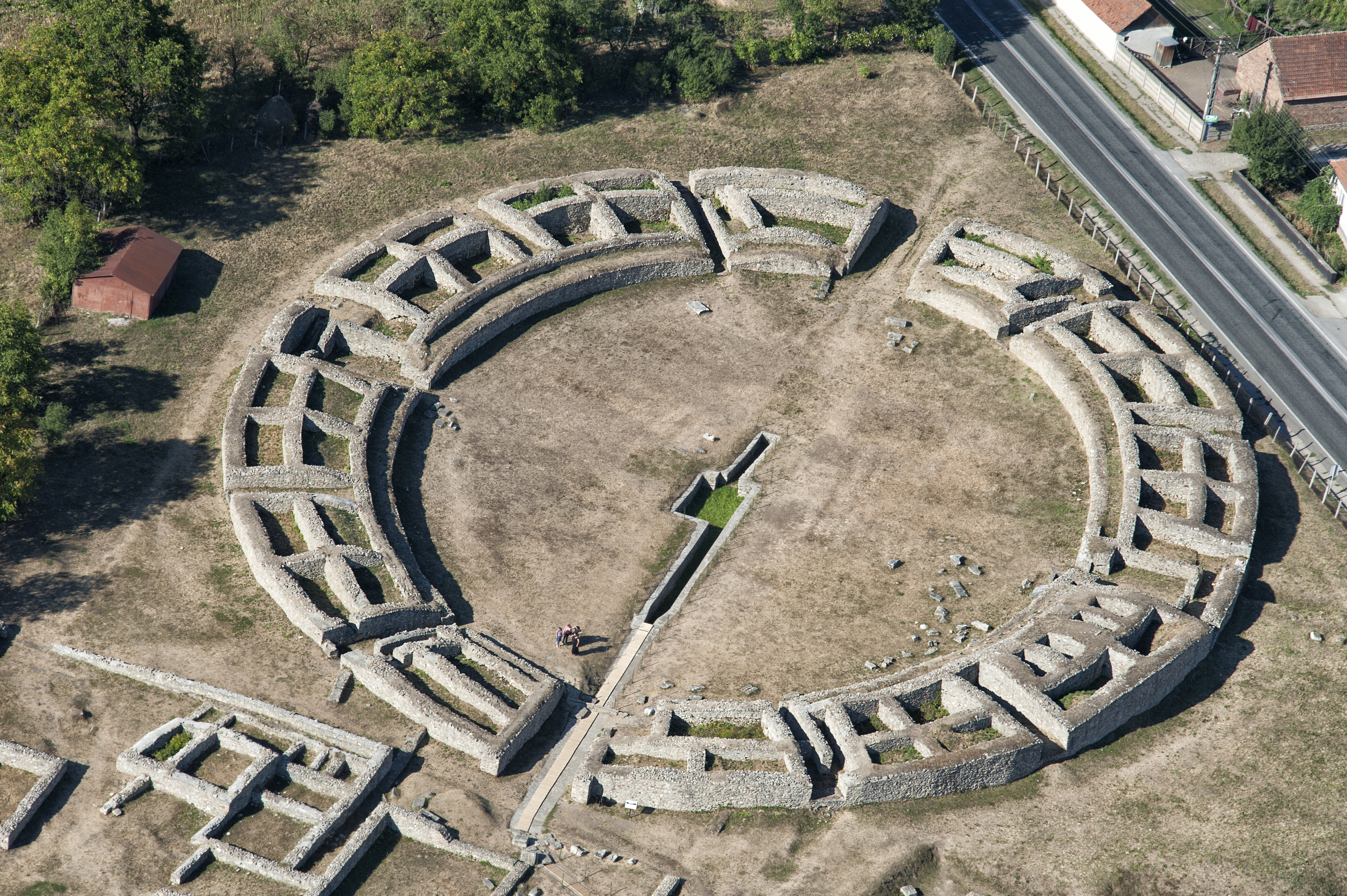
Aerial view

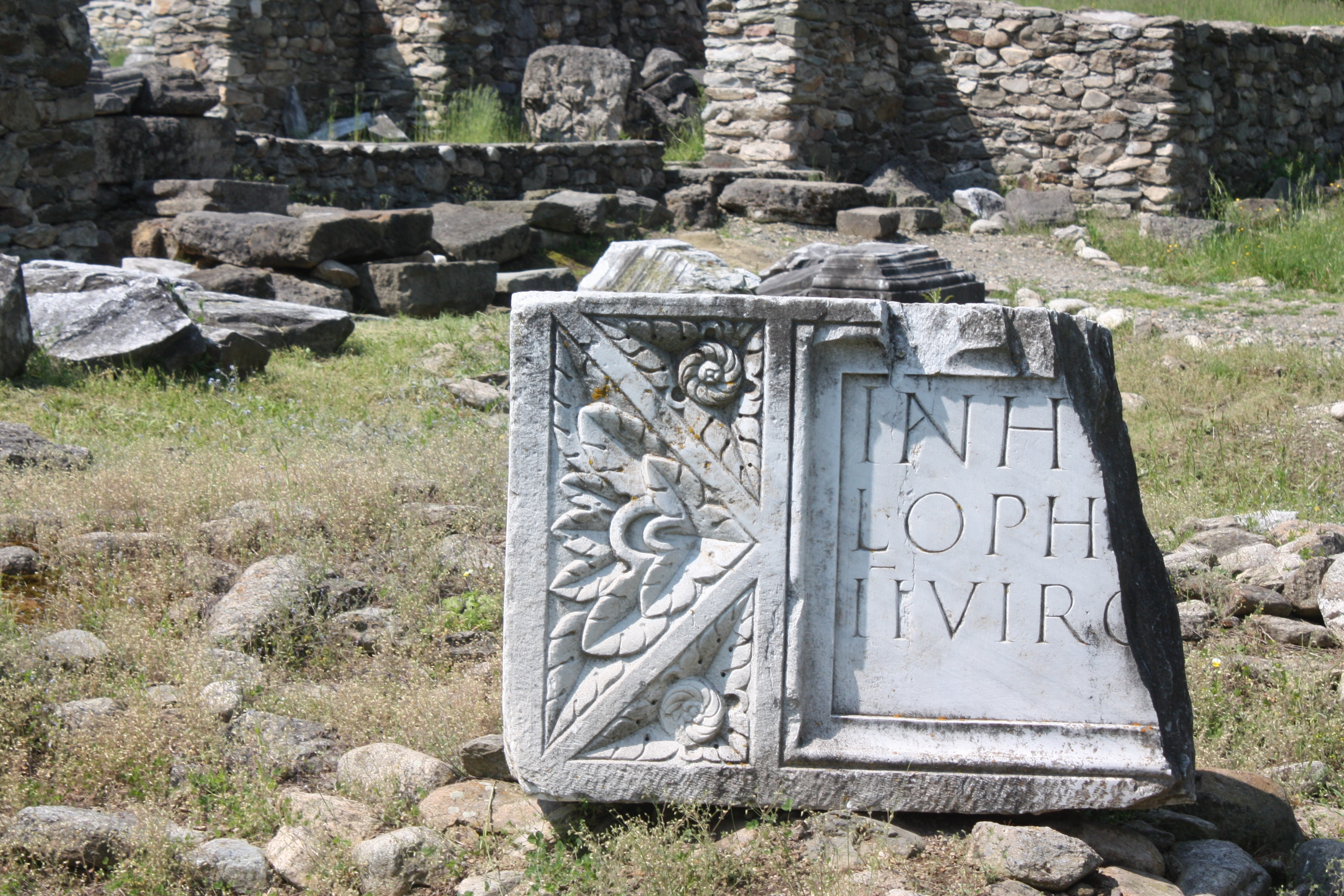
The frontispiece of the forum

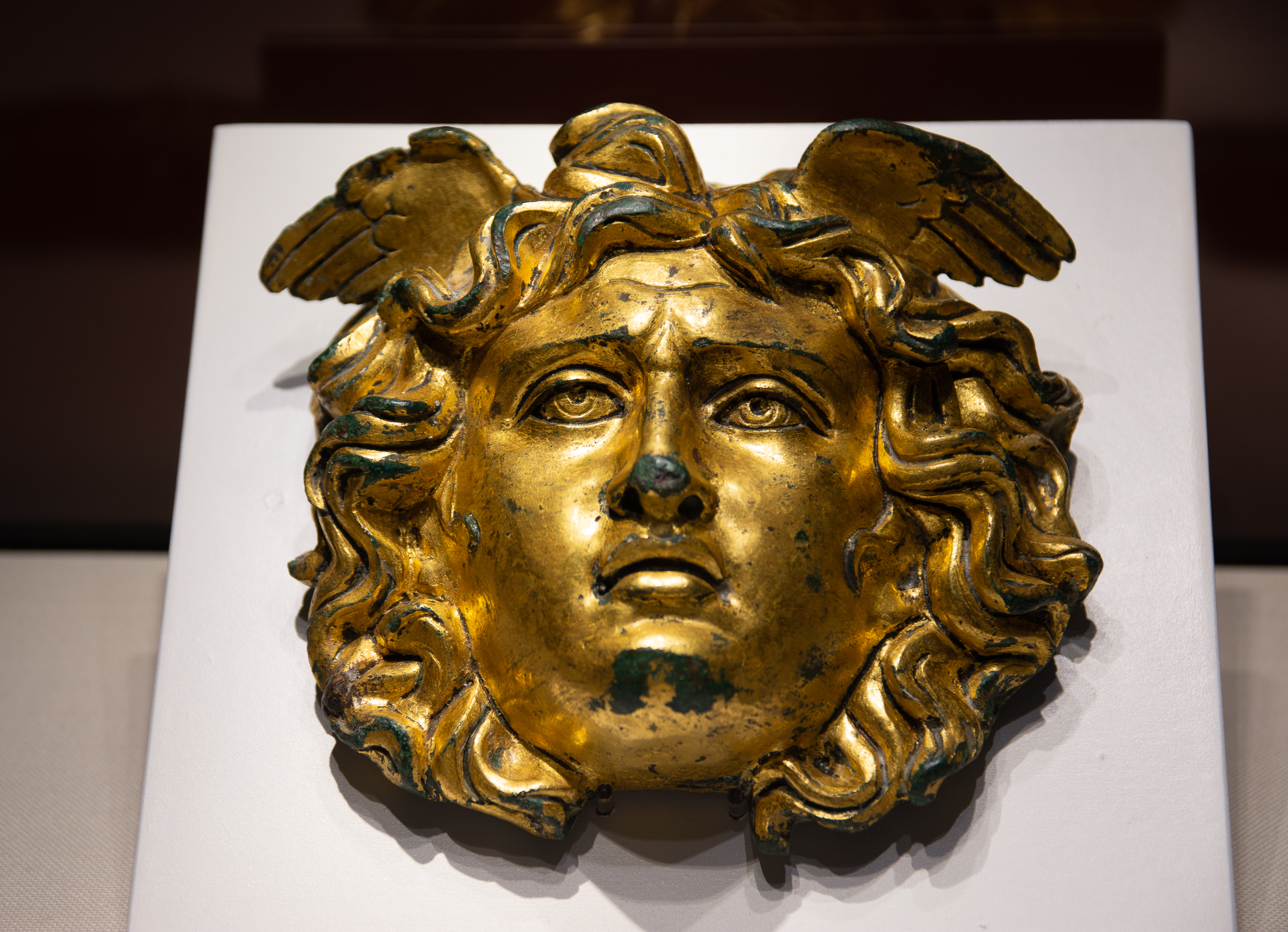
Aplique with the shape of Gorgona Medusa

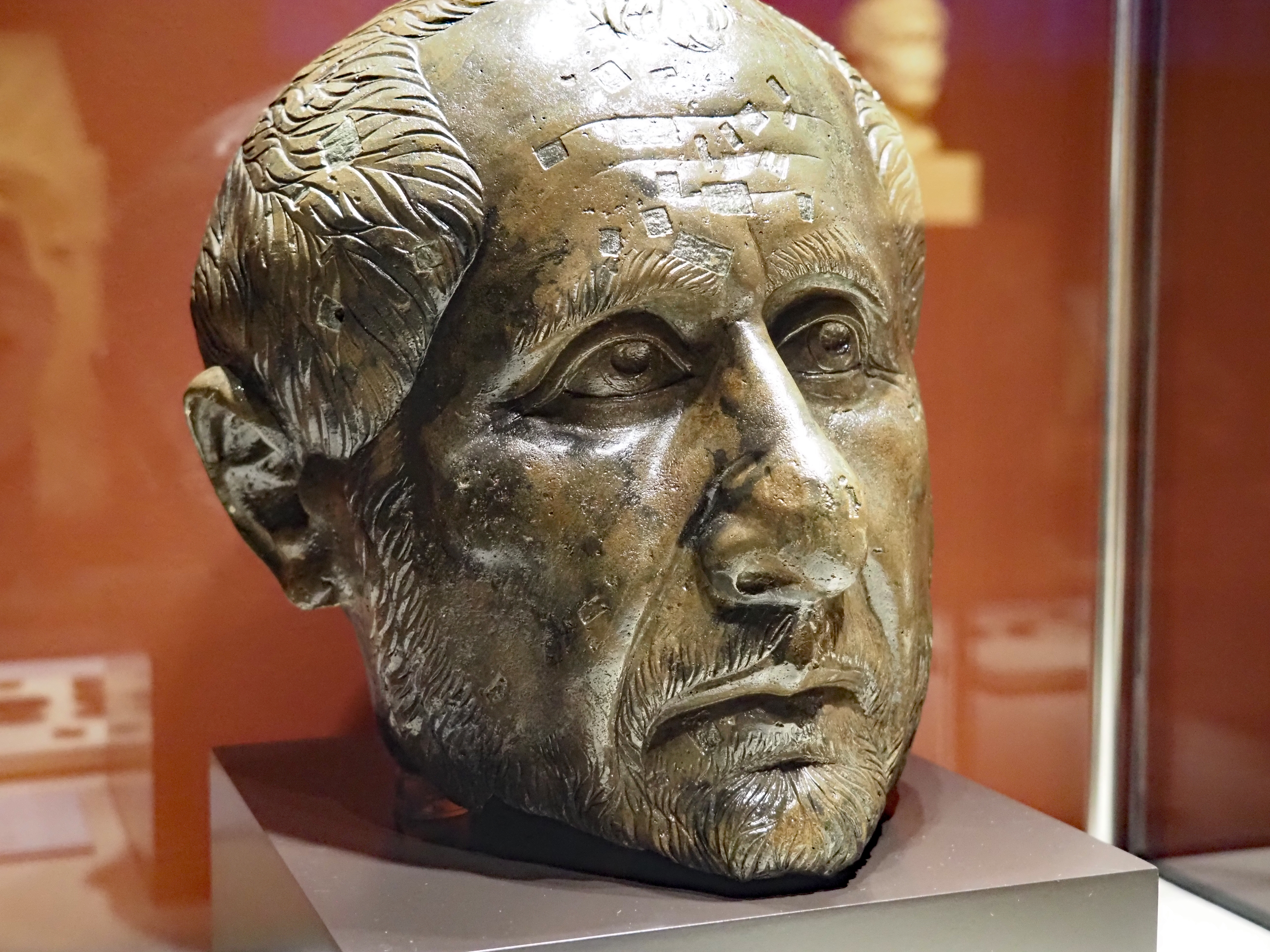
Bronze head of Decius found at the site

== See also ==
- List of castra

== Sources ==
Köpeczi, Béla; Makkai, László; Mócsy, András; Szász, Zoltán; Barta, Gábor, eds. (1994). History of Transylvania – From the Beginnings to 1606. Budapest: Akadémiai Kiadó. ISBN 978-963-05-6703-9.
