= Battle of Sarmizegetusa =

Roman siege of Sarmizegetusa, the capital of Dacia (106)

- Part of the Dacian Wars
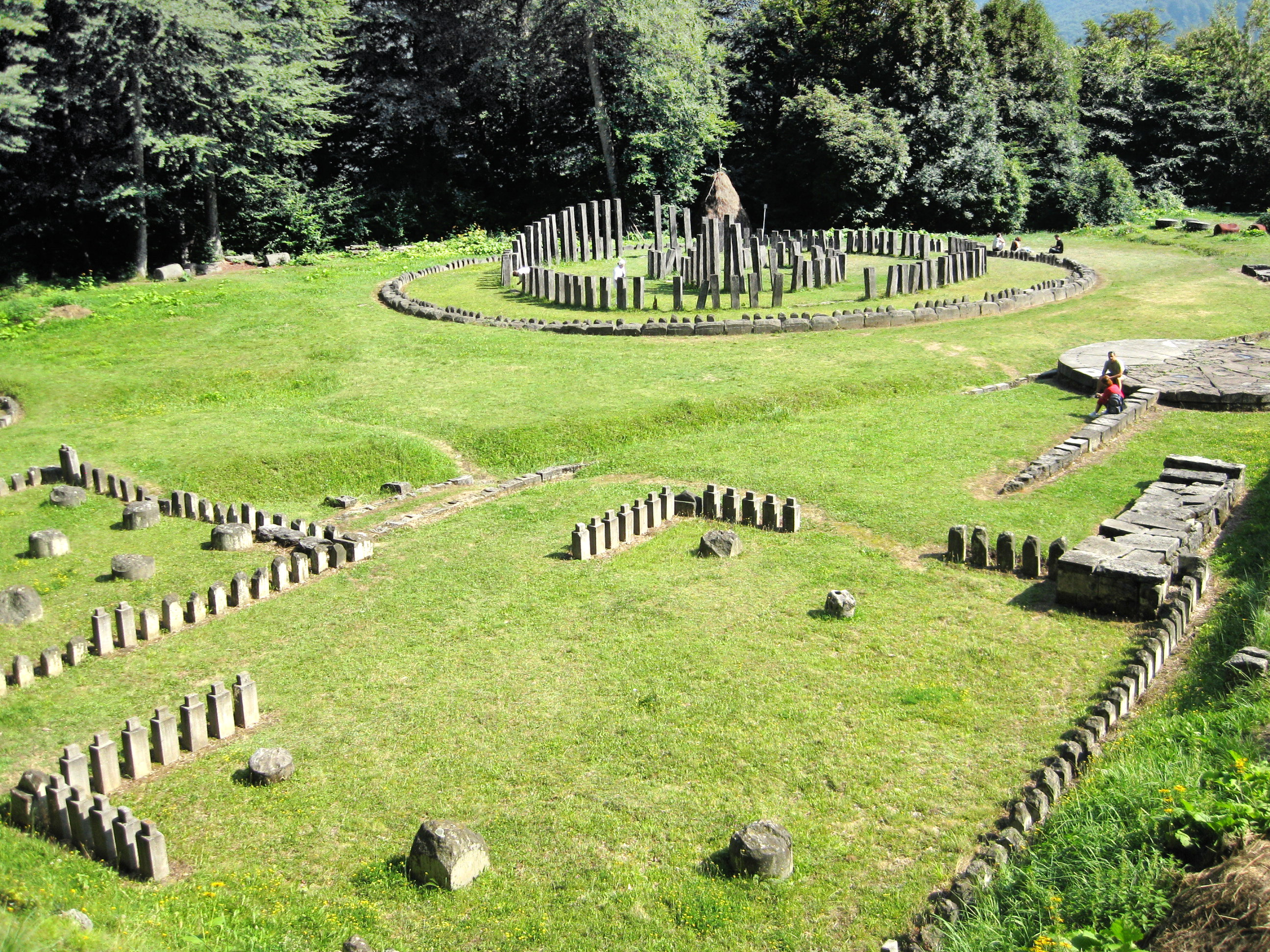
- The sanctuaries at Sarmizegetusa Regia, the capital of ancient Dacia (modern Romania)
Date	106
Location	Orăștioara de Sus, Transylvania, Romania 45°37′19″N 23°18′33″E
Result	Roman victory; Most of Dacia annexed to the Roman Empire

Belligerents
Dacia	Roman Empire

Commanders and leaders
Decebalus	Trajan

Strength
18,000–20,800	12 legions (around 60,000 legionnaires if conditions are optimal)
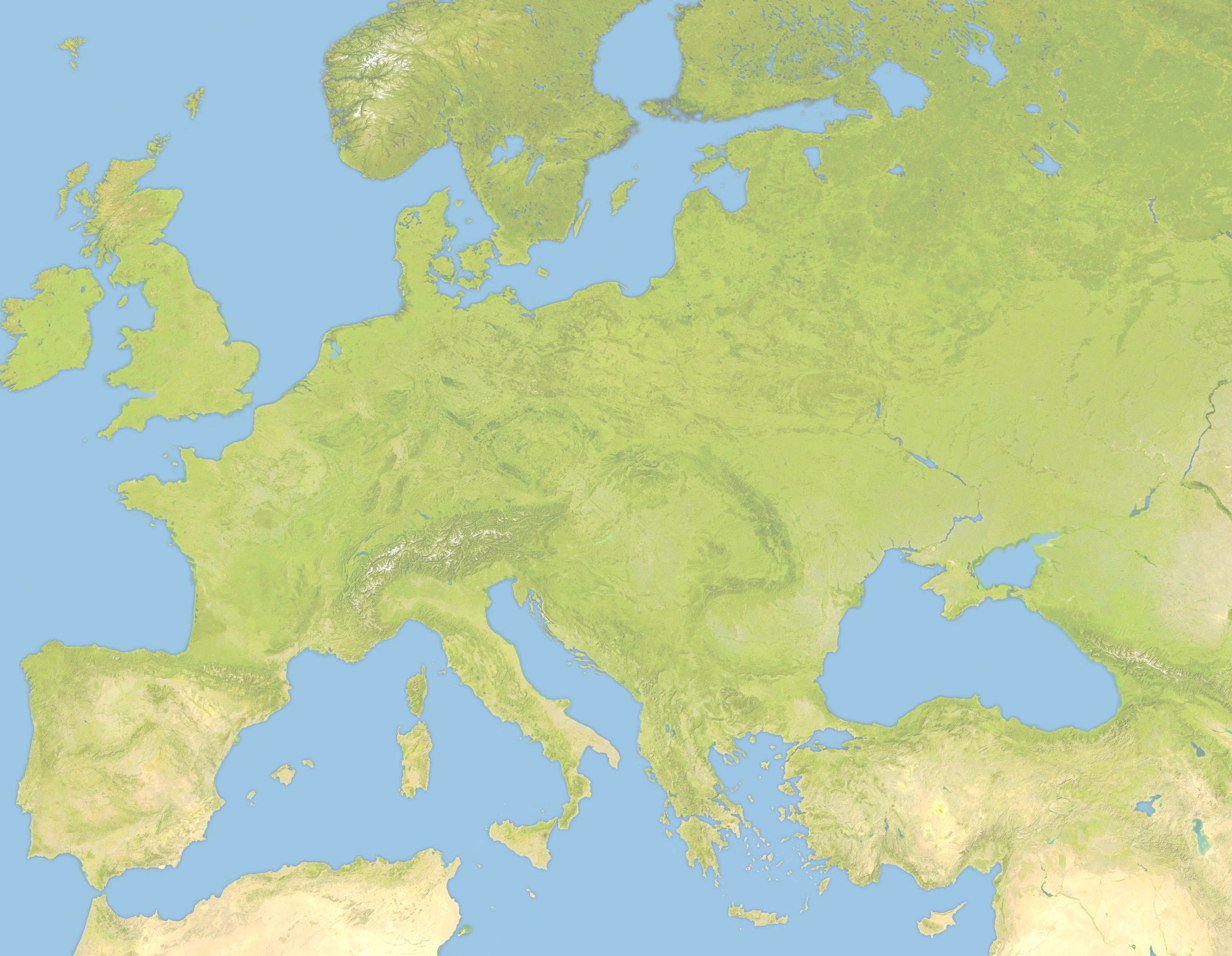
- Location within Romania Battle of Sarmizegetusa (Europe without the extreme north)

The Battle of Sarmizegetusa (also spelled Sarmizegethuza) was a siege of Sarmizegetusa, the capital of Dacia, fought in Trajan's Second Dacian War in 106 between the army of the Roman Emperor Trajan, and the Dacians led by King Decebalus.

== Background ==
After Trajan's First Dacian War (101-2), Decebalus did not respect the peace conditions imposed by Trajan, and in retaliation the Emperor prepared to annihilate the Dacian kingdom and finally conquer Sarmizegetusa in Trajan's Second Dacian War.

It is estimated that the Dacians most likely had fewer than 20,000 men capable of fighting the invasion.

== Advance ==
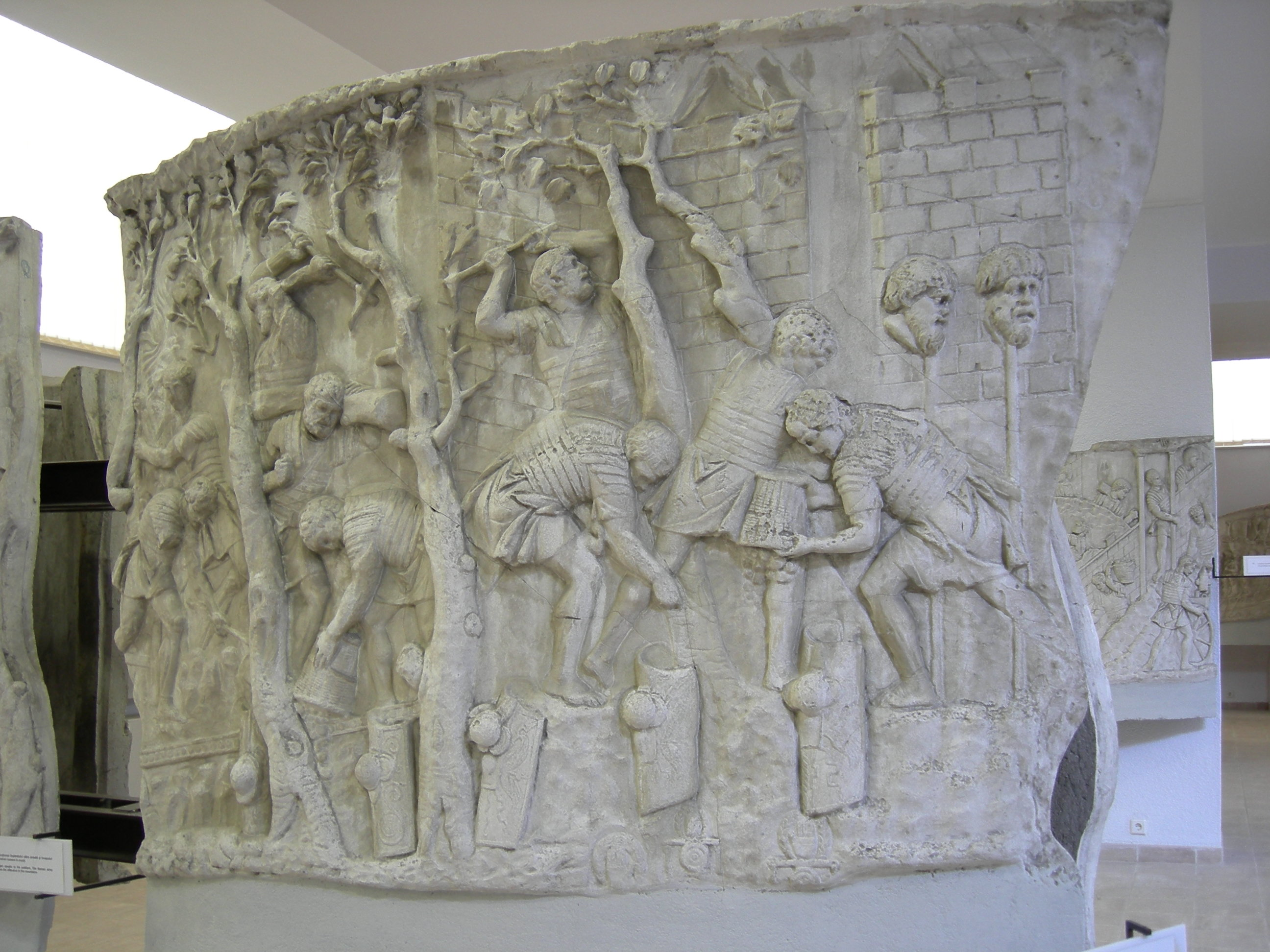
Roman soldiers building a bridge and a mountain road in Dacia, from Trajan's Column.

The Roman forces approached Sarmizegetuza in three main columns. The first column crossed the bridge built by Apollodorus of Damascus, and then followed the valleys of rivers Cerna and Timiş up to Tibiscum. They then turned on the valley of the river Bistra, through the Țara Haţegului depression. In these places, there were already Roman garrisons stationed from the first war, greatly easing the advance. They passed through Valea Cernei, Haţeg, and Valea Streiului and destroyed the Dacian fortresses at Costești, Blidaru, and Piatra Roșie.

The second column of the army is believed to have crossed the Danube somewhere near ancient Sucidava and then marched northwards on the valley of Jiu, linking with the first Roman column in Țara Haţegului.

The combined forces of the two columns then began attacking the area of the Şureanu Mountains, meeting sporadic but desperate resistance from the Dacians.

The third Roman column, most likely led by Trajan himself, advanced through eastern Muntenia, crossed the Carpathians at a location close to what is now Bran, and marched westwards through southern Transylvania.

The rest of the troops left from Moesia Inferior and passed through Bran, Bratocea, and Oituz and destroyed the Dacian fortresses between Cumidava (now Râșnov, in Romania) and Angustia (now Brețcu, in Romania). At the battle for the conquest of Sarmizegetusa the following legions participated: II Adiutrix, IV Flavia Felix, and a vexillatio of VI Ferrata which until this war had been stationed in Iudaea.

The Roman forces then enveloped Sarmizegetusa.

Other Roman units are believed to have attacked other Dacian settlements and rally points, as far as the river Tisa to the north, and Moldavia to the east. Dacian settlements in the west, such as Ziridava, were completely destroyed in this period. However, Moldavia and Maramureş, located in modern-day northern Romania, were never part of the Roman province of Dacia and would remain free from Roman rule.

== Siege ==
The only historical record of the siege is Trajan's Column, which is a controversial source. There is debate as to whether the Romans did actually fight for Sarmizegetusa, or whether the Dacians destroyed their capital while fleeing ahead of the advancing legions. Most historians agree that a siege of Sarmizegetusa actually took place.

The first assault was repelled by the Dacian defenders. The Romans bombarded the city with their siege weapons and, at the same time, built a platform to more easily breach the fortress. They also encircled the city with a circumvallatio wall.

Finally, the Romans destroyed the water pipes of Sarmizegetusa and obliged the defenders to surrender before they set fire to the city. Roman forces succeeded in entering the Dacian sacred enclosure, hailed Trajan as emperor, and then levelled the whole fortress. Legio IV Flavia Felix was stationed there to guard the ruins of Sarmizegetusa.

== See also ==
- Dacian warfare
- List of Roman battles
