= Castra of Bumbești-Jiu =

Castra of Bumbești-Jiu may refer to:

- Castra of Bumbești-Jiu - Gară, a fort in the Roman province of Dacia
- Castra of Bumbești-Jiu - Vârtop, a fort in the Roman province of Dacia

== See also ==
- Castra of Porceni
