= Sarmizegetusa Regia =

Dacian capital until 2nd century AD

- Dacian capital, Sarmisegetusa, Sarmizegethusa, Sarmisegethusa, Sarmisegethuza, Sarmageze, Sarmategte, Sermizegetusa, Zarmizegethusa, Zarmizegethousa, Zarmizegetusa, Zermizegethouse
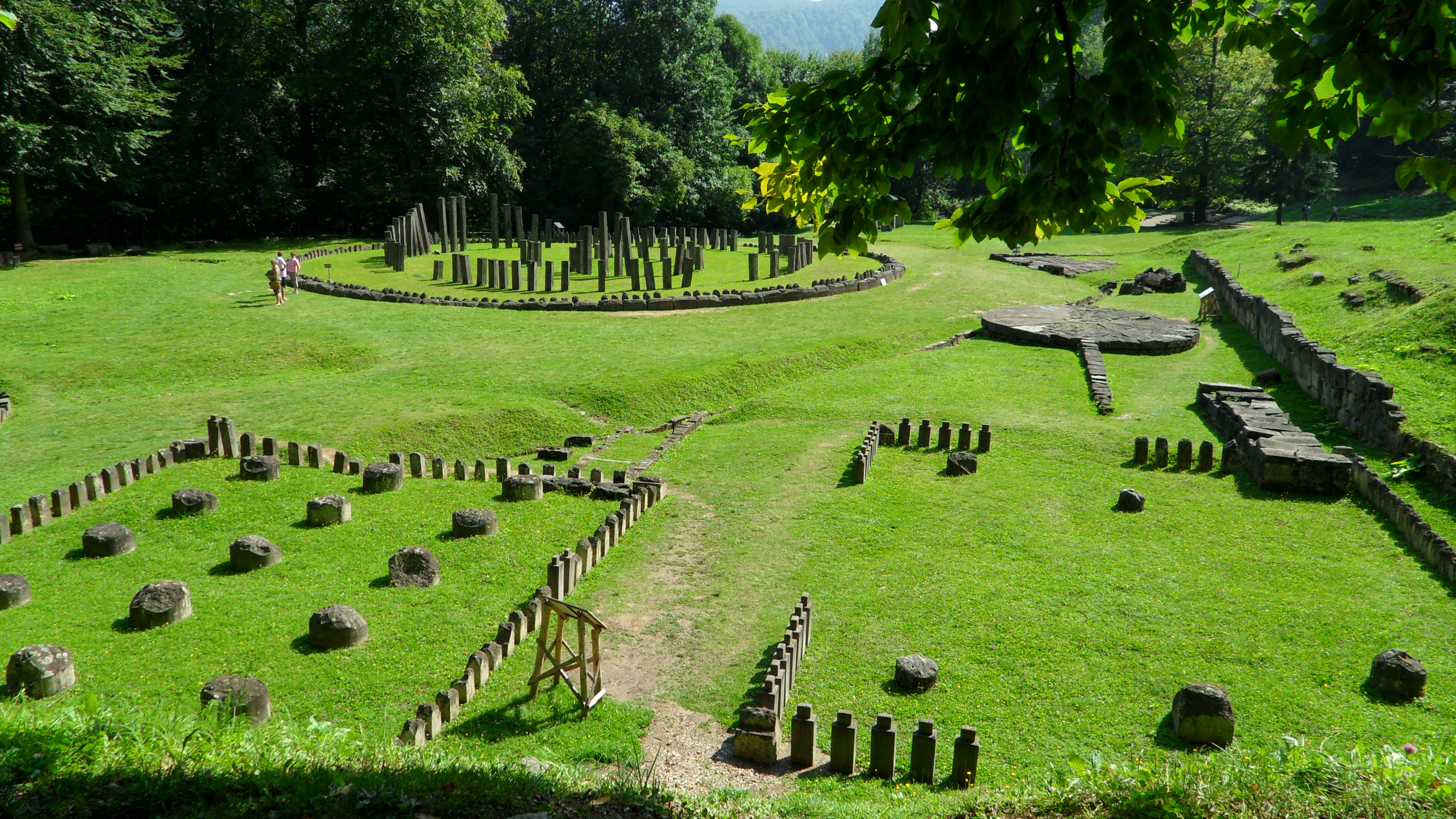
- Ruins of Dacian temples

- Location within Romania
- 45.6219°N 23.3093°E
- Location: Grădiștea de Munte, Hunedoara County, Romania

History
- Abandoned: 2nd century AD
- Event(s): Trajan's Dacian Wars, Battle of Sarmizegetusa

Site notes
- Elevation: 1,030 m (3,380 ft)
- Archaeologists: A. Rusu; A. Sion; Eugen Iaroslavschi; H. G. Seiwerth; Ioan Andrițoiu; Ioan Glodariu; Ștefan Ferenczi; Gelu Florea; Gabriela Gheorghiu; Darius Sima; Adriana Pescaru Rusu; Liliana Dana Suciu
- Condition: Partially reconstructed

Monument istoric
- Reference no.: HD-I-s-A-03190

UNESCO World Heritage Site
- Part of: Dacian Fortresses of the Orăștie Mountains
- Criteria: Cultural: (ii), (iii), (iv)
- Reference: 906
- Inscription: 1999 (23rd Session)

Sarmizegetusa Regia (also known as Sarmisegetusa, Sarmisegethusa, Sarmisegethuza; Ancient Greek: Ζαρμιζεγεθούσα, romanized: Zarmizegethoúsa) was the capital and the most important military, religious and political centre of the Dacians before the wars with the Roman Empire. Built on top of a 1200 m high mountain, the fortress, consisting of six citadels, was the core of a strategic and defensive system in the Orăștie Mountains (in present-day Romania). The archaeological site of Sarmizegetusa Regia is located in the village of Grădiștea de Munte in Hunedoara County.

Sarmizegetusa Regia should not be confused with Ulpia Traiana Sarmizegetusa, the Roman capital of Dacia built by Roman Emperor Trajan some 40 km away, which was not the Dacian capital. Sarmizegetusa Ulpia was discovered earlier, was known already in the early 1900s, and was initially mistaken for the Dacian capital, a confusion which led to incorrect conclusions being made regarding the military history and organization of the Dacians.

== Name ==
=== Variants ===
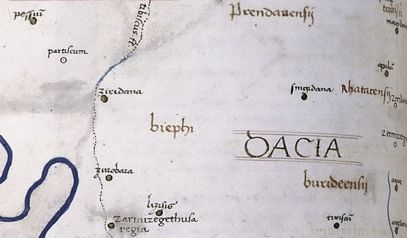
Zarmizegethusa Regia on Dacia's map from a medieval book made after Ptolemy's Geographia (ca. 140 AD).

Historical records show considerable variation in the spelling of the name of the Dacian capital:

- Zarmigethusa, Sarmisegethusa (Ptolemy, Geography, 2nd century AD)
- Zermizegethusa (Dio Cassius 2nd-3rd century)
- Sarmazege (Anonymous Geographer from Ravenna, around 700 AD)
- Sarmategte (Tabula Peutingeriana, 13th century)
- Zarmizegetusa and Sarmizegetusa (from inscriptions)
- Sargetia (name of the river nearby)

=== Etymology ===
The pronunciation in the Dacian language is not known for certain, nor is the meaning of the word. Several hypotheses have been advanced to explain the origin of the name Sarmizegetusa. The most important of these ascribe the following possible meanings to the city's name:

- ‘Citadel built of palisades on a mountain peak’ from zermi (*gher-mi ‘mountain peak, top’, cf. *gher ‘stone; high’) and zeget (from the Indo-European *geg(H)t ‘branch, pillar (for palisade)’ and ending with a determinant which has the meaning of "The Citadel on the Rock," "The High Citadel," "Palisade Citadel (built) on a height (or rock)." Since Sarmizegetusa was not initially a military fortification initially, but a religious and civil settlement, the etymology must be considered with certain reservations. It may be that the name indicated the sacrality of that place, or the fact that it was a royal citadel, at its origin.
- ‘City of the warm river’ from zarmi ‘warm’ (cognate with Sanskrit gharma ‘warm’) and zeget ‘flow’ (cognate with Sanskrit sarj- in sarjana- ‘flow’ and Bactrian harez- in harezâna ‘id.’), the city being named after the nearby river Sargetia
- 'Center where horse-mounted archers meet' from sar 'horse' (Getian and Sarmatian) combined with gethusa 'arrow' (cognate with Sarmatian sageta) and gethate 'center' (cognate Sarmatian cetate)
- ‘Palace illuminating the world of life’ from zaryma ‘palace’ (cf. Sanskrit harmya ‘palace’), zegeth ‘world of life’ (cf. Sanskrit jagat- ‘go’, and jigat- ‘mobility; world of life’) and usa ‘illuminating, enlightening; burning’)
- 'The capital of the Sarmatians and Gets' from the Latin terms: sarmis et getusa. 'SARMIS.E[T].GETUSA REGIA' is an alternate spelling of the full Latin name of the location. Getae and Dacians were interchangeable terms. The -A after GETUS is part of the genitive case in Latin, indicating ownership. This is plausible as the Dacians were allied with the Sarmatians (e.g., Roxolani) during the Dacian Wars in the early first century CE.
- 'The home of the Getic nation'. Vasile Pârvan proposed reading it as Sarmiz-egetusa in the sense of "Egetusa of Sarmos" or "Zarmos,", noting that Zarmos/Zermos was a known Thracian name cited by the Austrian researcher Wilhelm Tomaschek in his ethnological study Die alten Thraker (The Ancient Thracians). Pârvan's opinion was shared by the Bulgarian scientist and Thracologist Dimitar Dechev, who brought up for comparison the names of people from Lycia: Zermounsis, Ro-zarmas, Ia-zarmas, Troko-zarmas and the Thracian variant based on Zermos, Xermo-sígestos or Zermo-sígestos. Tomaschek had proposed in that 19th-century work the reading Zermi-zegétousa, comparing the first part with harmyá from Sanskrit "hearth; home; family" and the Armenian word zarm(i) "family, offspring," the final meaning supposed by Tomaschek being "the house of the (Getic) nation."

== Layout ==
Map of the site

Sarmizegetusa Regia contained a citadel, the largest of the Dacian fortifications, and residential areas with dwellings and workshops as well as a sacred zone.

- The fortress, a quadrilateral formed by massive stone blocks (murus dacicus), was constructed on five terraces, on an area of almost 30,000 m².
- The sacred zone — among the most important and largest circular and rectangular Dacian sanctuaries – includes a number of rectangular temples, the bases of their supporting columns still visible in regular arrays. Perhaps the most enigmatic construction at the site is the large circular sanctuary or calendar. It consisted of a setting of timber posts in the shape of a D, surrounded by a timber circle which in turn was surrounded by a low stone kerb. The layout of the timber settings bears some resemblance to the stone monument at Stonehenge in England.
- An artifact referred to as the “Andesite Sun" seems to have been used as a sundial. Since it is known that Dacian culture was influenced by contact with Hellenisitic Greece, the sundial may have resulted from the Dacians' exposure to Hellenistic learning in geometry and astronomy.
- Civilians lived below the citadel itself in settlements built on artificial terraces, such as the one at Feţele Albe. A system of ceramic pipes channeled running water into the residences of the nobility.

The archaeological inventory found at the site demonstrates that Dacian society had a relatively high standard of living.

The citadel wall was 3 m thick and about 4 – 5 m high at the time of its completion. Because the wall, which encloses an area of about 3 ha, is built to follow the edges of the height, the citadel has a more unusual configuration, that of a hexagon with unequal sides. Nearby, to the west, there is an extensive civil settlement covering an area of 3 km, where many dwellings, workshops, warehouses, barns, and water reservoirs can be observed. 100 meters to the east, right at the citadel gate on the same cardinal point, are the sanctuaries, which have varied shapes and sizes. The sanctuaries were located on a terrace, which had been connected to the aforementioned gate by a paved road. It is not known whether there were seven or eight quadrilateral sanctuaries, as they were destroyed by the Romans during hostilities and it cannot be determined whether it was a single large sanctuary or two smaller ones built very close together. There are only two circular sanctuaries.

=== The defensive system ===
The Dacian capital’s defensive system includes six Dacian fortresses — Sarmizegetusa, Costești-Blidaru, Piatra Roșie, Costești-Cetățuie, Căpâlna and Bănița. All six have been named UNESCO World heritage sites.

== History ==
=== Pre-Roman era ===
Towards the end of his reign, Burebista transferred the Geto-Dacian capital from Argedava to Sarmizegetusa. Serving as the Dacian capital for at least one and a half centuries, Sarmizegethusa reached its zenith under King Decebal. Archaeological findings suggest that the Dacian god Zalmoxis and his chief priest had an important role in Dacian society at this time. They have also shed new light on the political, economic and scientific development of the Dacians and their successful assimilation of technical and scientific knowledge from the Greek and Romans.

The site has yielded two especially notable finds:

- A medical kit, in a brassbound wooden box with an iron handle, containing a scalpel, tweezers, powdered pumice and miniature pots for pharmaceuticals
- A huge vase, 24 in (0.6 m) high and 41 in (1.04 m) across, bearing an inscription in the Roman alphabet: DECEBAL PER SCORILO, i.e. ‘Decebalus, son (cf. Latin puer) of Scorilus’

Roman Dacia and Moesia Inferior.

- gold coins inscribed "KOSON"

The smithies north of the sanctuary also provide evidence of the Dacians' skill in metalworking: findings include tools such as metre-long tongs, hammers and anvils which were used to make some 400 metallic artefacts — scythes, sickles, hoes, rakes, picks, pruning hooks, knives, plowshares, and carpenters' tools — as well as weapons such as daggers, curved Dacian scimitars, spearpoints, and shields.

The capital of Dacia reached its peak under Decebalus, the Dacian king defeated by the Roman Empire during the reign of Emperor Trajan.

=== Roman era ===
After the defeat of the Dacians, the conquerors established a military garrison there and began to tear down the citadel. Sarmizegetusa's walls were partly dismantled at the end of the First Dacian War in AD 102, when Dacia was invaded by the Emperor Trajan of the Roman Empire and rebuilt as Roman fortifications. The latter were subsequently destroyed, possibly by the Dacians, and then rebuilt again following the successful siege of the site in AD 105–6.

Later, the Romans built a new capital, Colonia Ulpia Traiana Augusta Dacica Sarmizegetusa, at a distance of 40 km from Sarmizegetusa Regia. Emperor Hadrian wanted the new capital built by Trajan to be perceived as a successor to the Dacian one, which is why he added the name Sarmizegetusa to it. Today, the village of Sarmizegetusa, Hunedoara is located on the site of Ulpia Traiana Sarmizegetusa.

== Present ==
In 2011, employees of a company destroyed a part of the Dacian site to build a 3,000-square-meter parking lot, putting the citadel wall in danger of collapse over a length of approximately 30 meters. The construction of the parking lot was paid for by the Hunedoara County Council, intended for tourists visiting the site, and was done without the approval or supervision of archaeologists.

Because of archaeological poaching and vandalism, the site is currently under 24/7 surveillance.

== Gallery ==
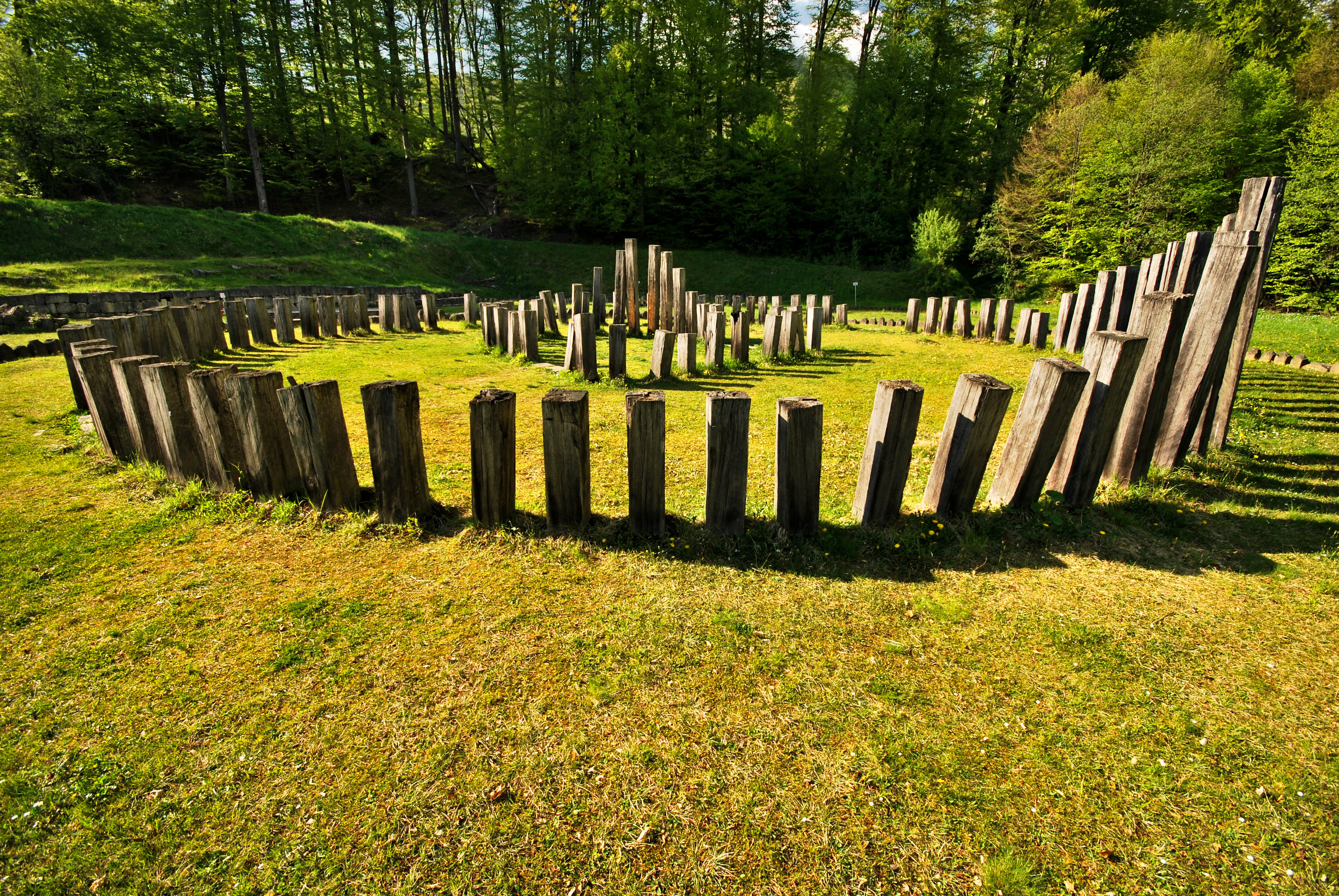
Sarmizegetusa Regia the great circular sanctuary (sacred area)

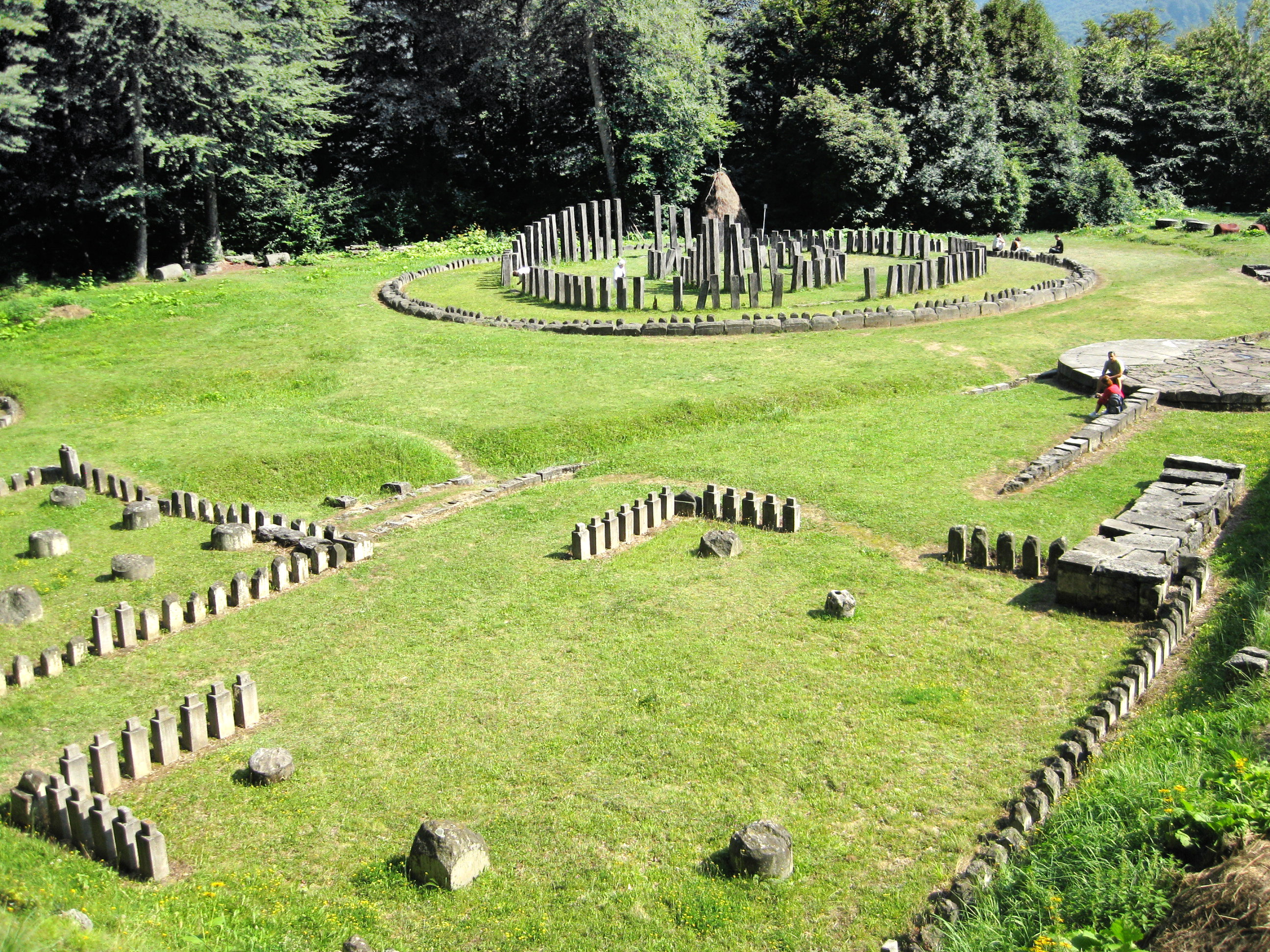
Sanctuaries

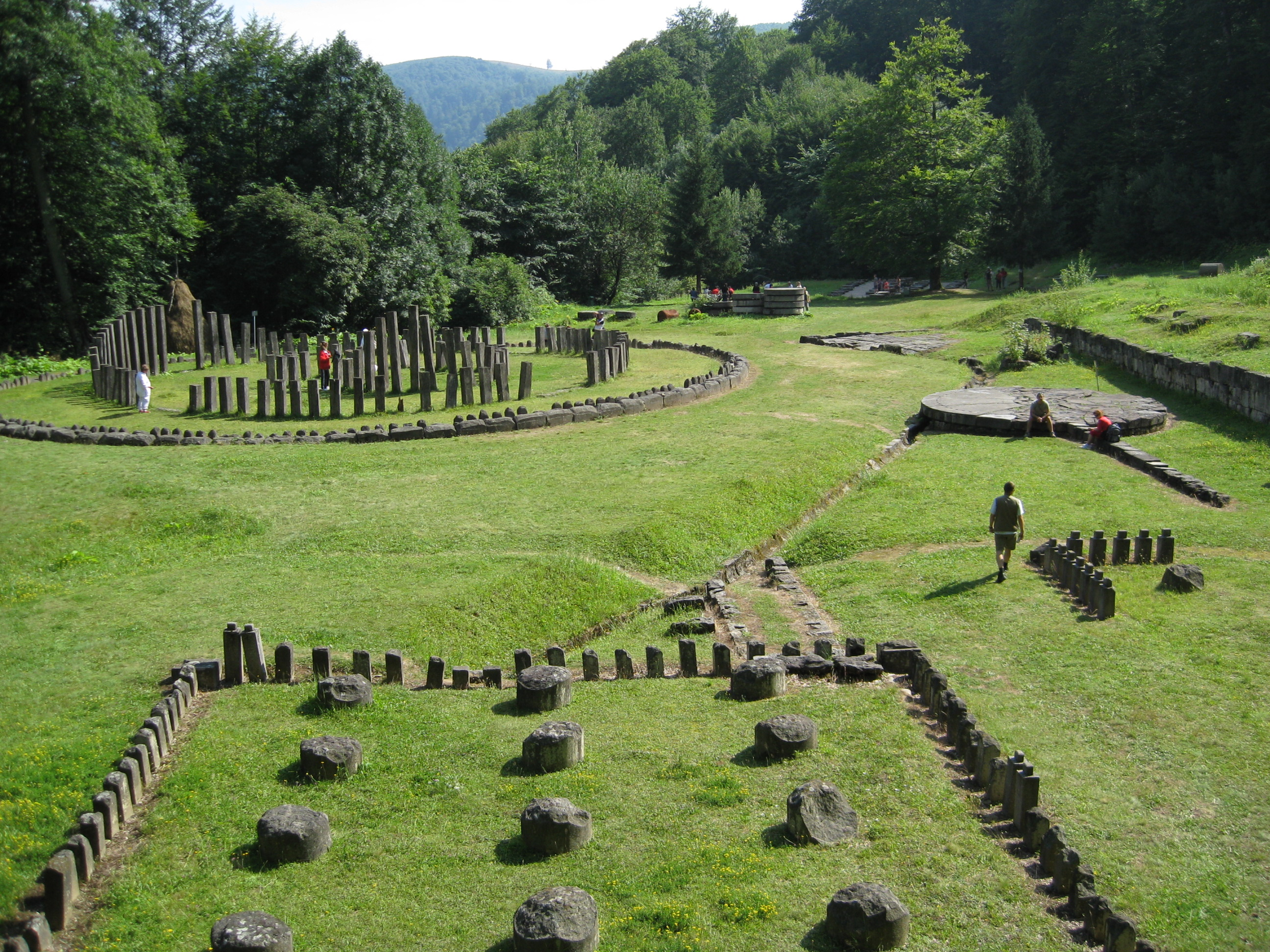
Andesite sanctuaries

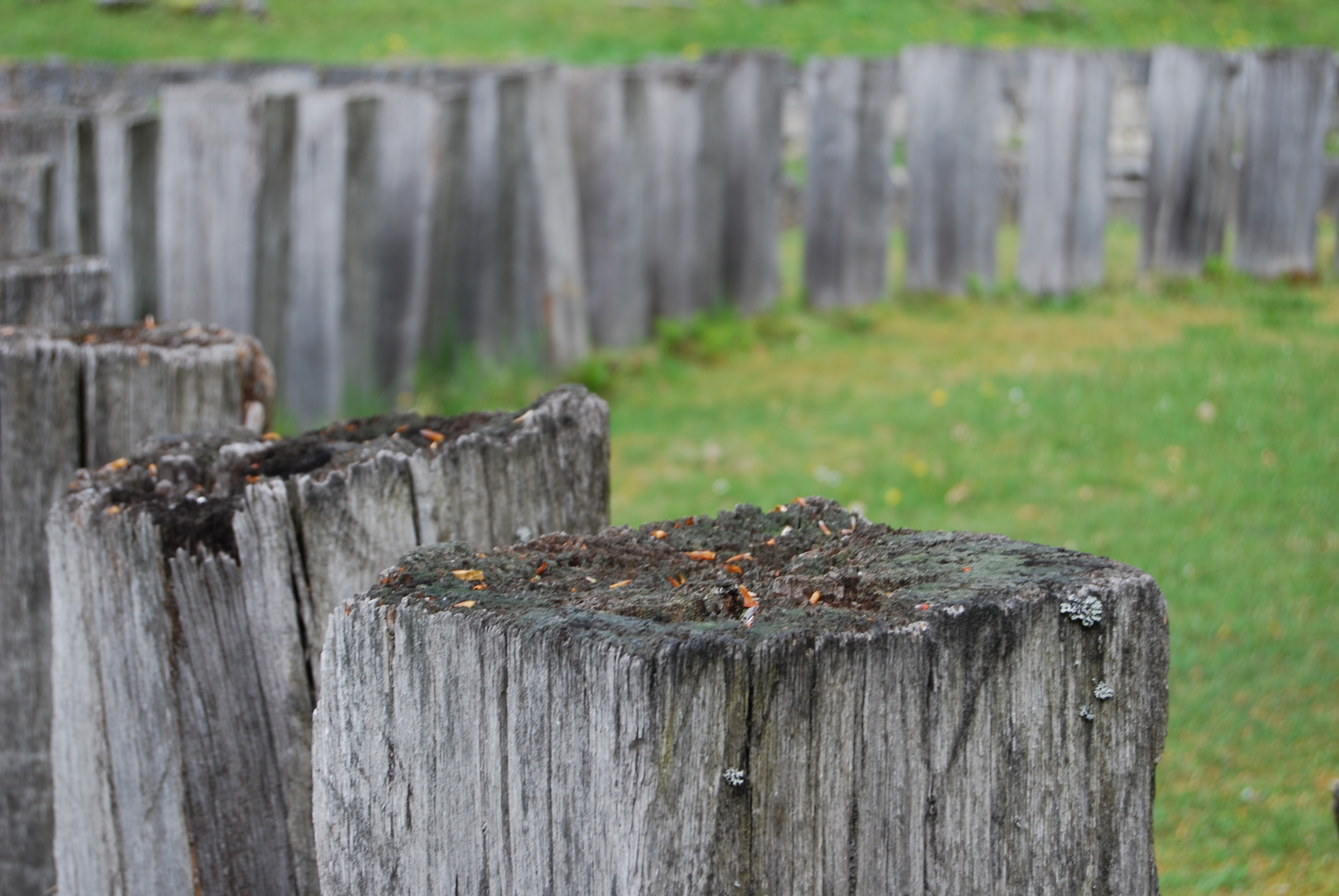

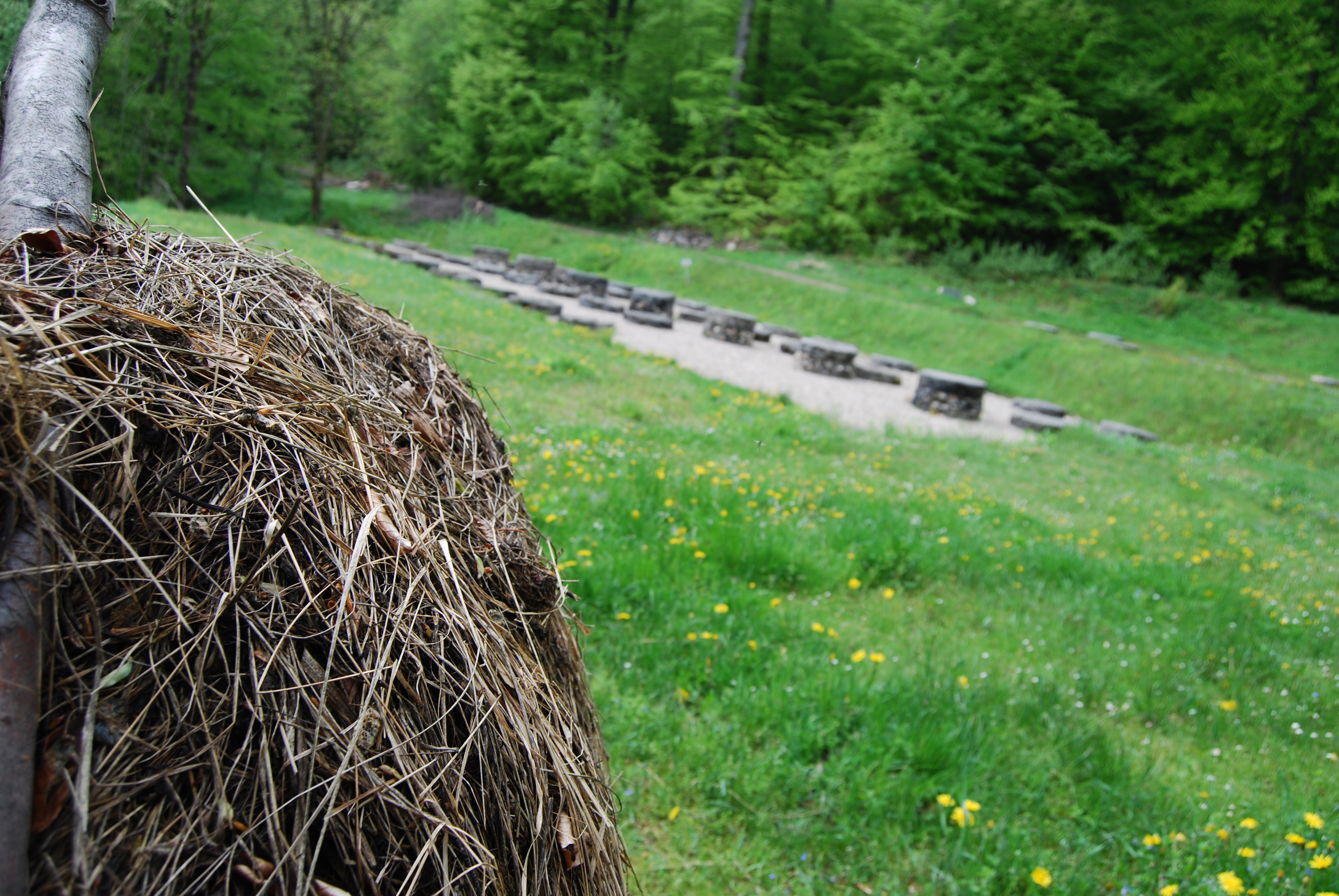
Large limestone sanctuary

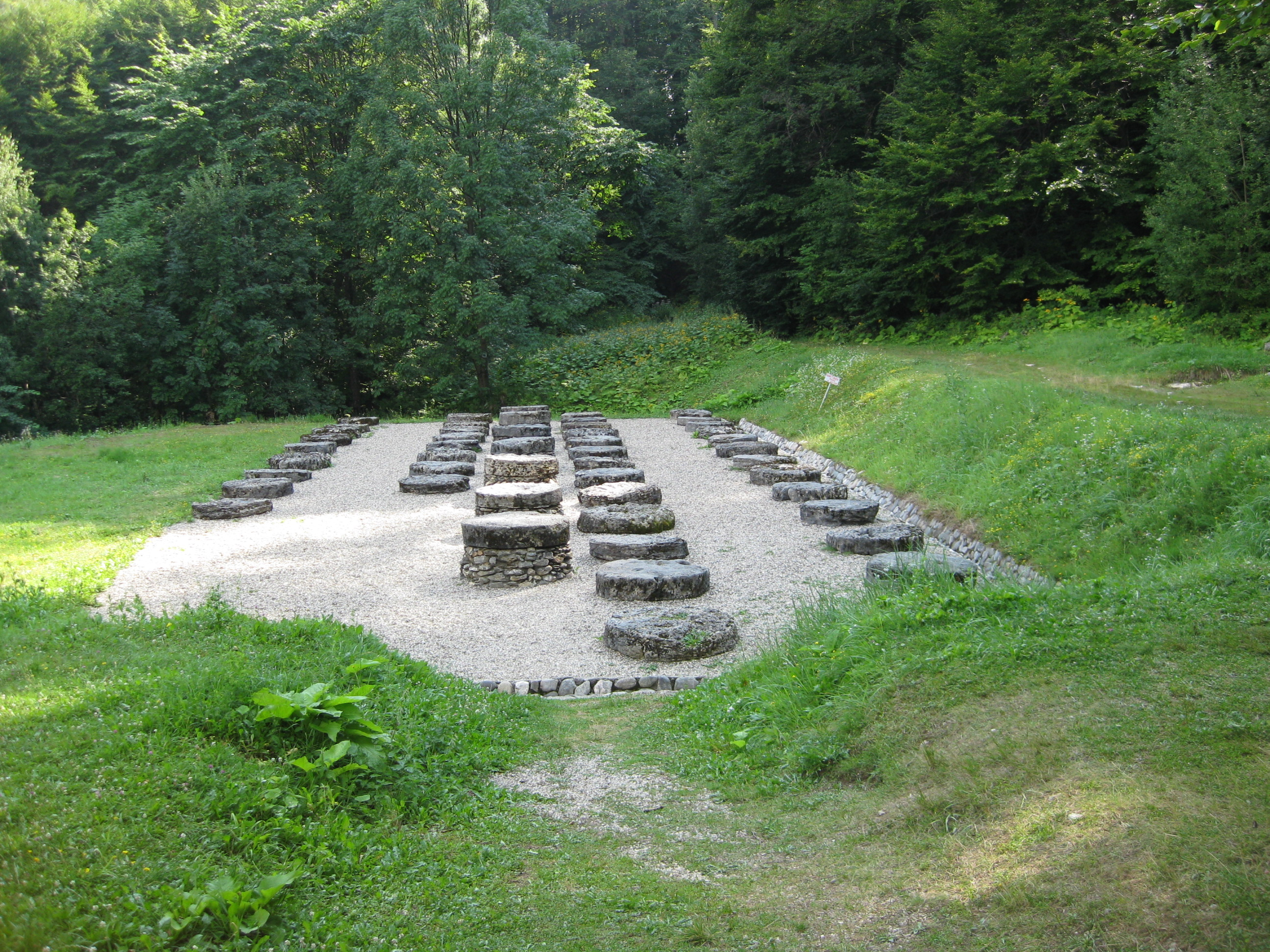
Large limestone sanctuary

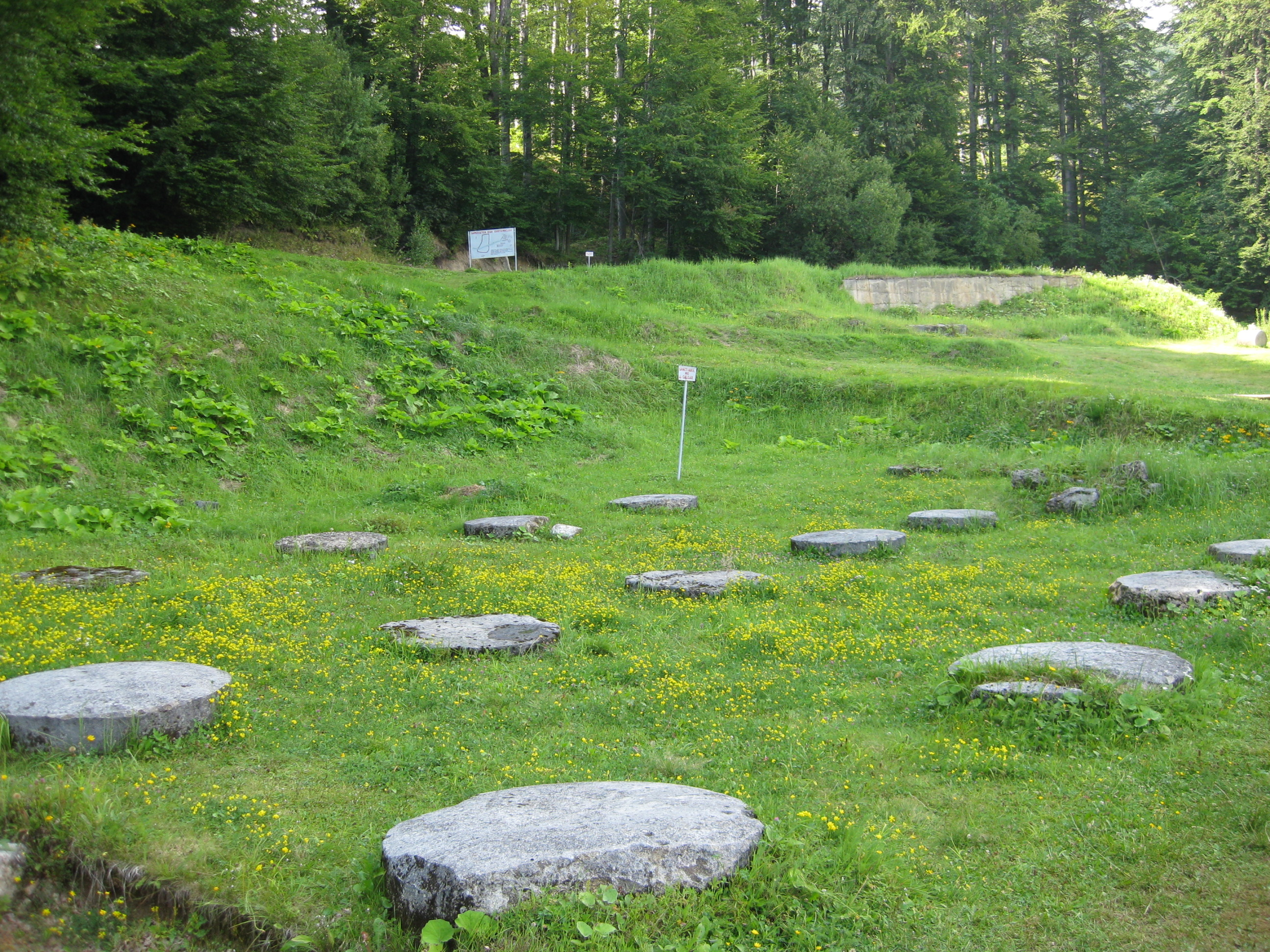
Small limestone sanctuary

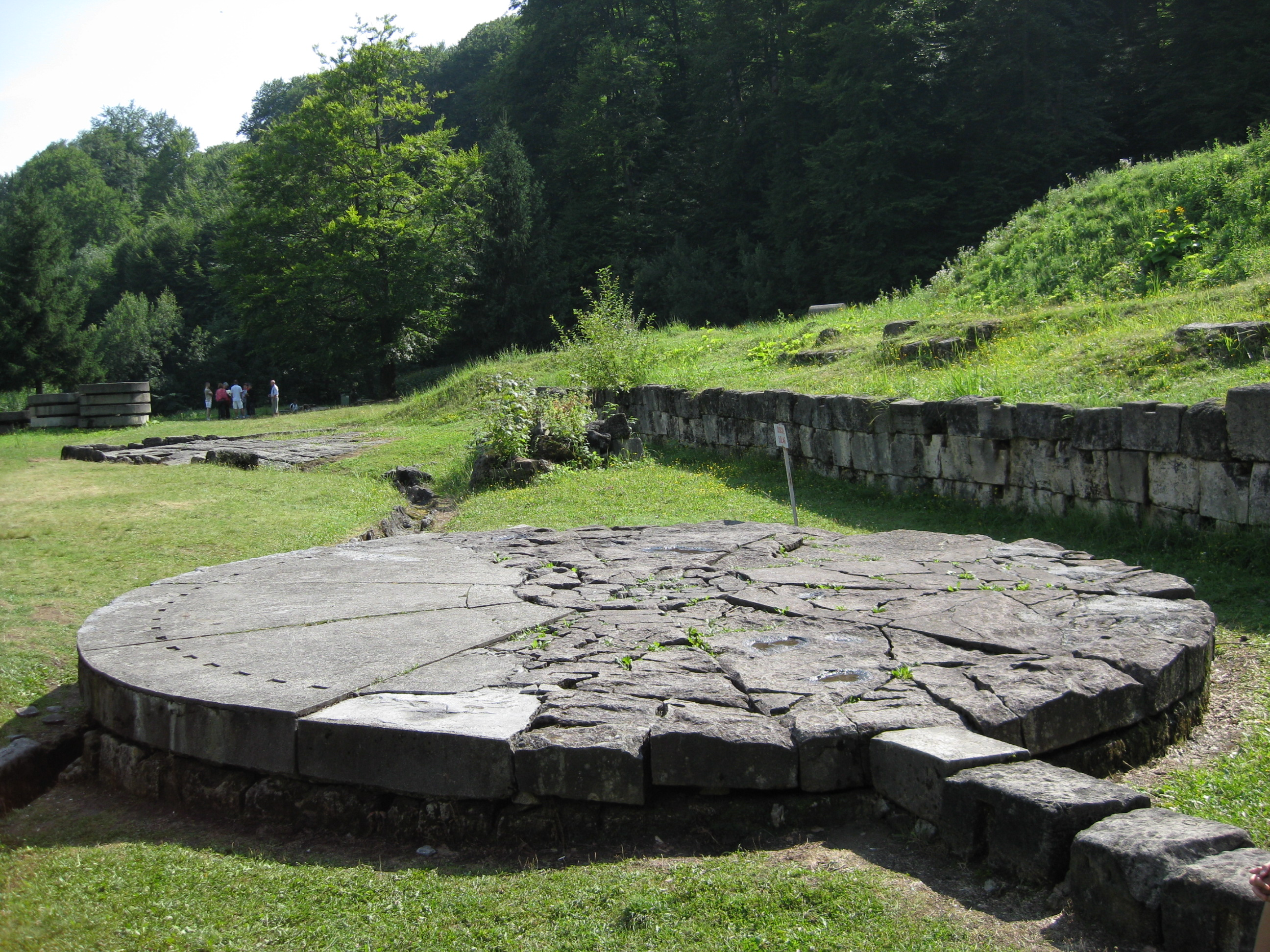
Solar disk

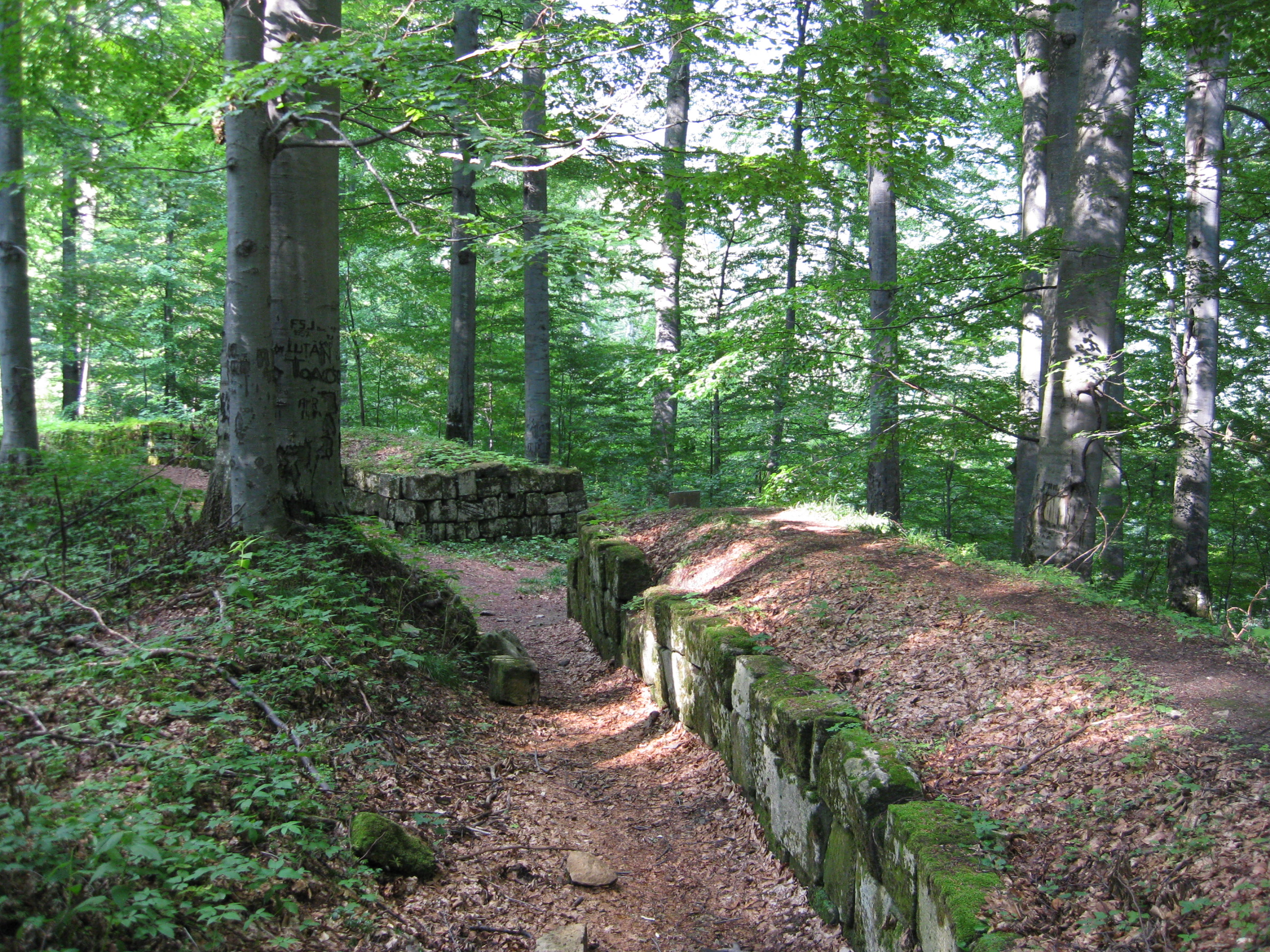
Murus dacicus

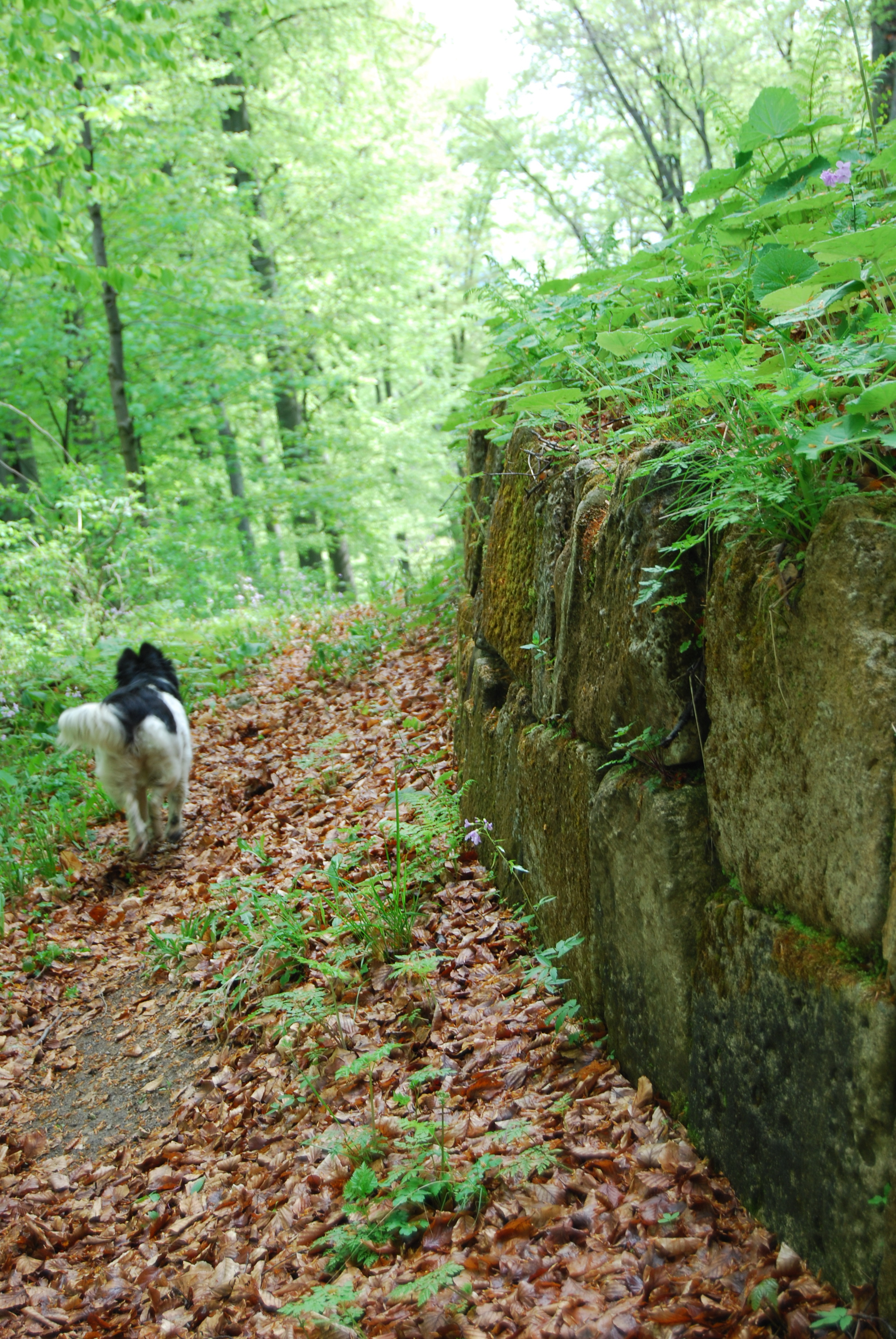
Dacian wall

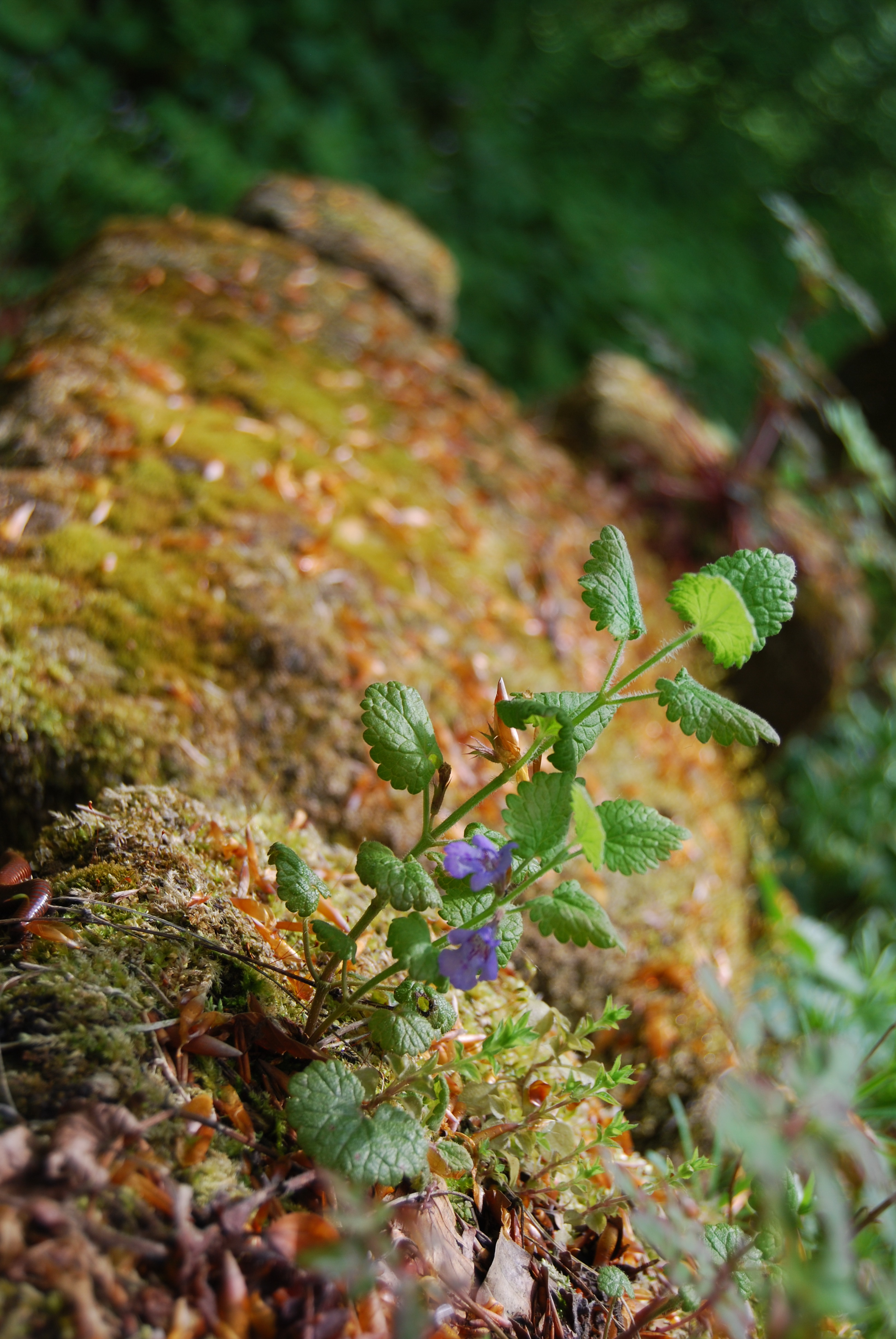
Dacian wall

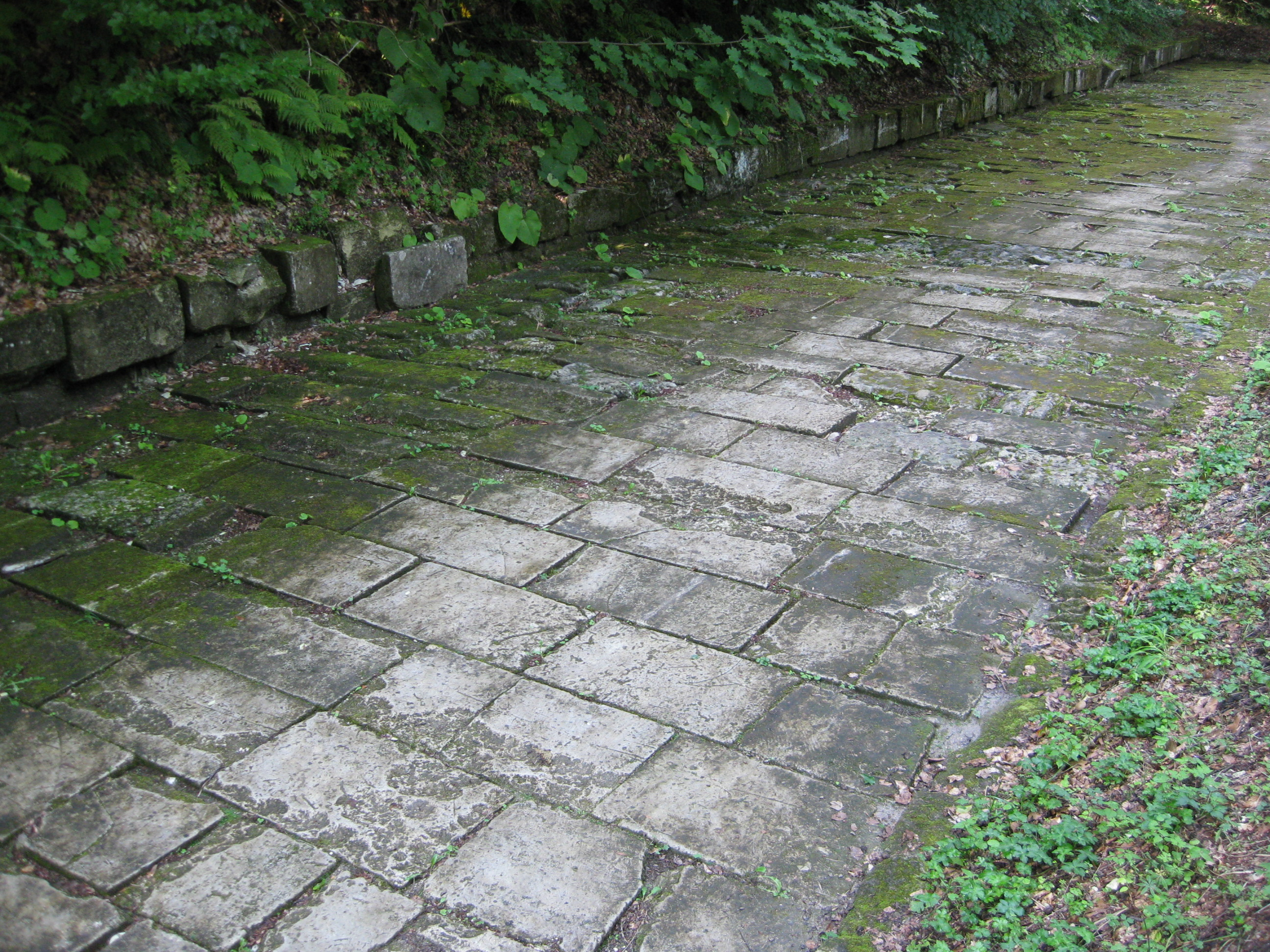
Paved Dacian road

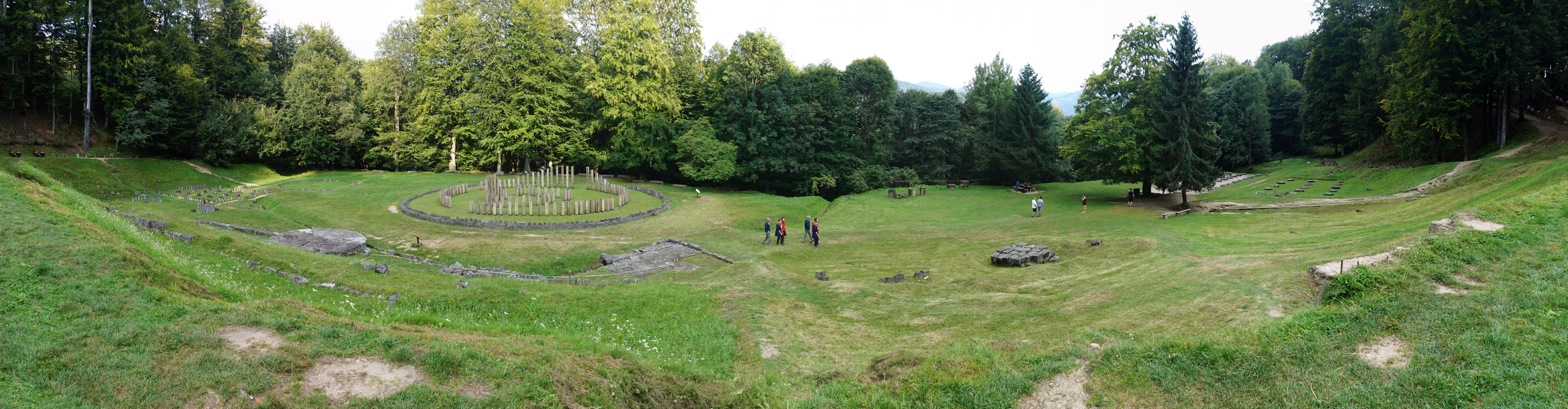
Panoramic view of the sanctuaries

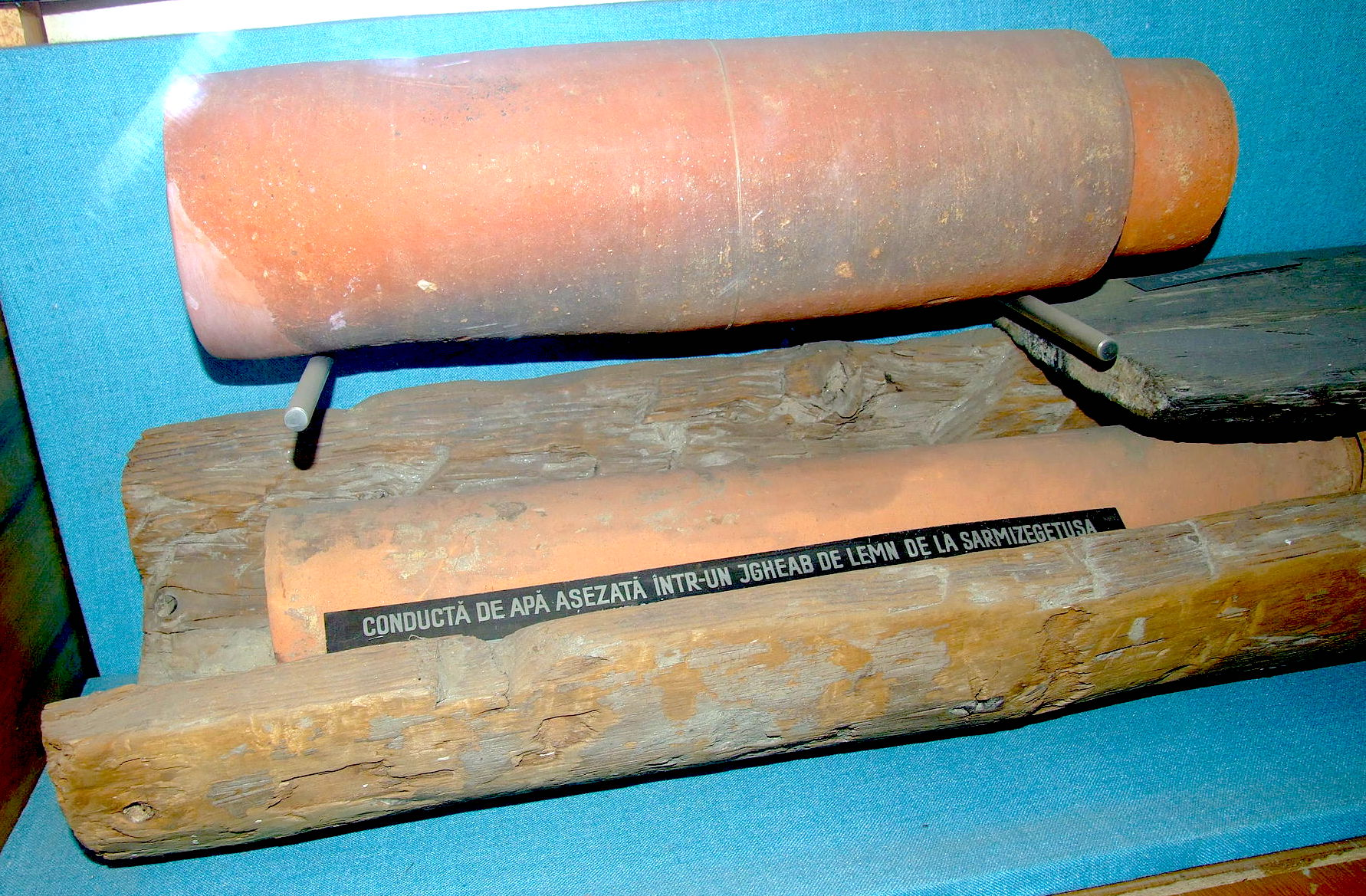
Dacian Water Pipe

== See also ==
- Ulpia Traiana Sarmizegetusa
- List of Dacian towns
- Decebalus
- Dacian Fortresses of the Orăștie Mountains
- Seven Wonders of Romania
- World Heritage Sites
