= Sarmizegetusa, Hunedoara =

Sarmizegetusa
- Commune
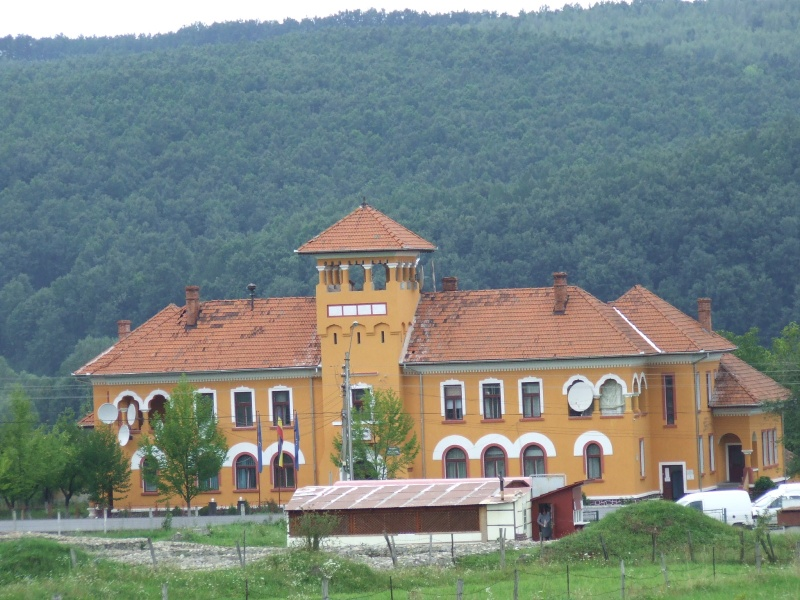
- Town hall

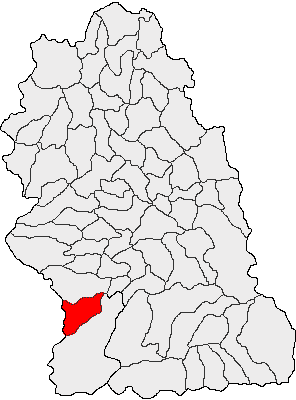
- Location in Hunedoara County

- Location in Romania
- Coordinates: 45°31′N 22°47′E
- Country: Romania
- County: Hunedoara

Government
  - Mayor (2024–2028): Aurora-Gina Socaciu (PSD)
- Area: 73.12 km^{2} (28.23 sq mi)
- Elevation: 493 m (1,617 ft)
- Population (2021-12-01): 1,018
  - Density: 13.92/km^{2} (36.06/sq mi)
- Time zone: UTC+02:00 (EET)
  - Summer (DST): UTC+03:00 (EEST)
- Postal code: 337415
- Area code: (+40) 0254
- Vehicle reg.: HD
- Website: comuna-sarmizegetusa.ro

Sarmizegetusa (colloquially and until 1941 officially Grădiște; Hungarian: Várhely, German: Burgort) is a commune in Țara Hațegului depression, Hunedoara County, Transylvania, Romania. It is composed of five villages: Breazova (Brázova), Hobița-Grădiște (Hobicavárhely), Păucinești (Paucsinesd), Sarmizegetusa, and Zeicani (Zajkány).

Built atop the ruins of the capital of Roman Dacia, Ulpia Traiana Sarmizegetusa, it is some 40 km (25 mi) from the capital of the Dacian kingdom, Sarmizegetusa Regia. The ruins of both Ulpia Traiana Sarmizegetusa and Sarmizegetusa Regia are still available for visiting.

Historical population
Year	Pop.	±%
1850	2,642	—
1890	2,911	+10.2%
2002	1,388	−52.3%
2011	1,209	−12.9%
2021	1,018	−15.8%
Source: Census data
