= Castra of Bulci =

Fort in the Roman province of Dacia

- Castra of Bata
- Location within Romania
- 46.011608°N 22.120492°E
- Location: La cetate, Bulci, Arad, Romania

History
- Founded: 2nd century AD
- Abandoned: 4th century AD

Site notes
- Elevation: 145 m (476 ft)
- Excavation dates: 1868; 1976 - 1980
- Archaeologists: Flóris Rómer; István Ferencz; Mircea Barbu
- Condition: Ruined

The castra of Bulci was a fort in the Roman province of Dacia located on the western side of defensive line of forts, limes Daciae. Its ruins are located in Bulci (commune Bata, Romania).

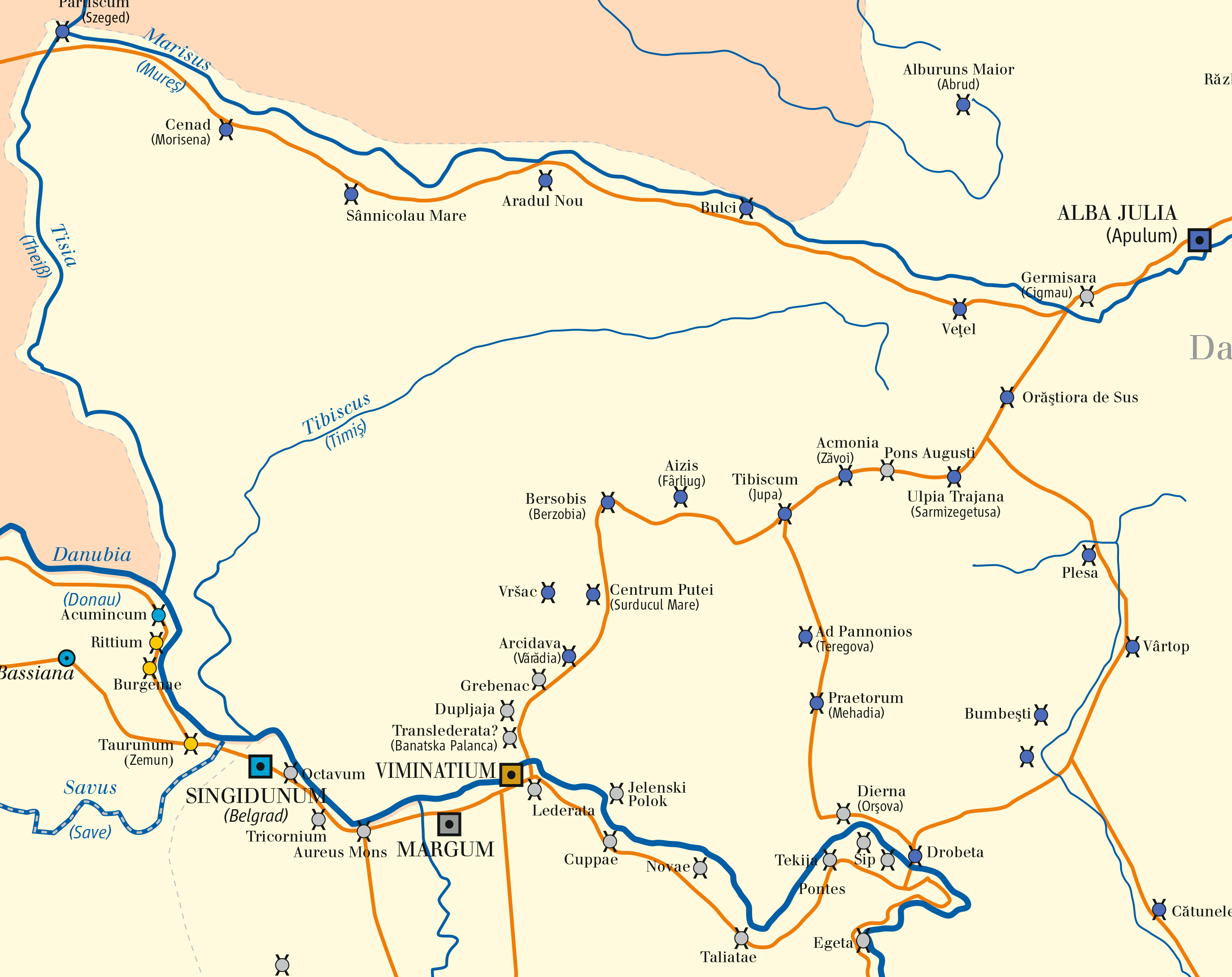
Western Dacia forts

== Location and function ==
The region in Arad county has been inhabited with short interruptions since the Neolithic. During the first half of the 1st millennium BC, the Dacians founded their first branches on both sides of Marisus. From the 6th century BC onwards, the Scythians, among others, settled here and later merged into the Dacians. At the end of the 4th century BC Celtic tribes also began to migrate here but they were also quickly assimilated by the Dacians.

The fort, possibly occupied by an auxiliary cohort, lay east of today's village of Bata on the left bank of the Mureș. The site is also known by its field names "Cetate" (castle) or "Mănăstire" (monastery). Its garrison was responsible, among other things, for monitoring and securing the road from Micia to Partiscum, which followed the southern bank of the river in the North-West direction.

== The fort ==
The fort area has only been insufficiently researched. It was first examined in 1868 by Flóris Rómer, the founder of provincial Roman archaeology in Hungary, and then between 1976 and 1980 smaller search excavations were carried out by István Ferenczi and Mircea Barbu. The defence consisted of a wooden-earth wall with a ditch in front of it as an obstacle to approach. Only small traces of the internal buildings could be found. The brick stamps found in Legio XIII Gemina seem to at least confirm the identification of the site as a Roman military installation of the 2nd century AD. The fortification was probably built by a vexillation of this legion. No remains of the fort itself can be seen in the area today.

The finds from the excavations can be found today in the Museum complex Arad, Department of Archaeology and History (Romanian "Complexul muzeal Arad, Secția Arheologie și Istorie").

== Monument protection ==
The entire archaeological site, and in particular the fort, are protected as historical monuments.

== See also ==
- List of castra
