= Castra of Sânpaul =

Castra of Sânpaul may refer to:

- Castra of Sânpaul (Harghita), a fort in Dacia
- Castra of Sânpaul (Mureș), a fort in Dacia
