= Răcari (disambiguation) =

Răcari may refer to several places in Romania:

- Răcari, a town in Dâmbovița County
- Răcari (Răcarii de Jos from 1968 to 2017), a village in Brădești, Dolj
- Castra of Răcarii de Jos Roman fort
- Răcarii de Sus, a village in Filiași town, Dolj County
- Durankulak, a village in Bulgaria known in Romanian as Răcari
