= Castra of Albești =

Fort in the Roman province of Dacia

- Location within Romania
- 44.676269°N 24.467584°E
- Location: Albești, Olt, Romania

History
- Founded: 3rd century AD
- Abandoned: 3rd century AD

Site notes
- Elevation: 285 m (935 ft)
- Condition: Ruined

Castra of Albești was a fort in the Roman province of Dacia in the 3rd century AD. Its ruins are located in Albești (commune Poboru, Romania).

== See also ==
- List of castra
