= Castra Nova =

Castra Nova may refer to the following (Roman) entities :

- Castra Nova equitum singularium, an ancient Roman fort in Rome which came to house part of the mounted imperial bodyguard equites singulares

Places and jurisdictions

- Castra Nova (Mauretania), also a former bishopric, presently Mohammadia in Algeria and a Latin Catholic titular see
- Castra Nova, Dacia
