= Castra of Crâmpoia =

Fort in the Roman province of Dacia

- Castra of Ghioca
- Location within Romania
- 44°18′37″N 24°43′38″E
- Location: Ghioca, Crâmpoia, Olt, Romania

History
- Founded: 2nd century AD
- Abandoned: 3rd century AD

Site notes
- Condition: Ruined

The castra of Crâmpoia was a fort in the Roman province of Dacia. It was made of earth in the 2nd century AD. The Romans abandoned the fort in the 3rd century. Its ruins are located in Crâmpoia, Romania.

== See also ==
- List of castra
