= Castra of Titești =

Roman fort in Dacia

- Location within Romania
- 45.4192°N 24.3908°E
- Location: Cazanului Hill, Titești, Vâlcea, Romania

History
- Founded: 2nd century AD

Site notes
- Excavation dates: 1893
- Archaeologists: Pamfil Polonic
- Condition: Ruined

Castra of Titești was a fort in the Roman province of Dacia near the Limes Alutanus on the west bank of the Olt River.

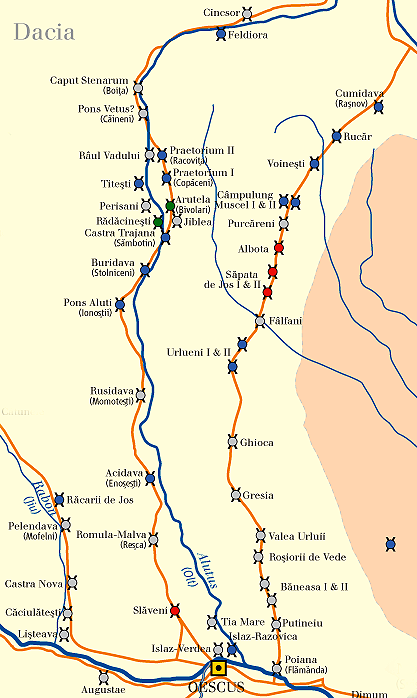
Limes Alutanus (left)

== See also ==
- List of castra
