= Tomis =

Tomis may refer to:

- An Ancient Greek city, now Constanța, a city in Romania
- Tomis (castra), the Roman fort of Constanța
- Tomis (spider), a genus of jumping spiders
- C.S. Volei 2004 Tomis Constanța, female volleyball club from Constanța, Romania
- C.V.M. Tomis Constanța, male volleyball club from Constanța, Romania
