= Castra of Porceni =

Fort in the Roman province of Dacia

- Castra of Pleșa
- Location within Romania
- 45.18°N 23.37°E
- Location: Școală, Porceni, Gorj, Romania

History
- Founded: 2nd century AD

Site notes
- Elevation: 330 m (1,080 ft)
- Excavation dates: 1897; 1979; 1983
- Archaeologists: Constantin Petolescu; Cristian Vlădescu; Expectatus Bujor; Floricel Marinescu; Gheorghe Calotoiu; Pamfil Polonic
- Condition: Ruined

It was a fort in the Roman province of Dacia.

== See also ==
- List of castra
