= Castellum of Bădeni =

- Castra of Bădeni; Castra of Mărtiniș
- Location within Romania
- 46.21°N 25.34°E
- Location: Bădeni, Harghita, Romania

History
- Founded: 2nd century AD
- Abandoned: 3rd century AD

Site notes
- Condition: Ruined

The castellum of Bădeni was a fort in the Roman province of Dacia in the 2nd and 3rd centuries AD. Its ruins are located in Bădeni (Hungarian: Bágy) in the commune of Mărtiniș (Hungarian: Homoródszentmárton) in Romania.

== See also ==
- List of castra
