= Castra of Brusturi =

Fort in the Roman province of Dacia

- Location within Romania
- 47°09′37″N 23°13′27″E
- Location: Brusturi, Sălaj, Romania

History
- Founded: 2nd century AD
- Abandoned: 3rd century AD

Site notes
- Condition: Ruined

The castra of Brusturi was a fort in the Roman province of Dacia in the 2nd and 3rd centuries AD. Its ruins are located in Brusturi (commune Creaca, Romania).

== See also ==
- List of castra
