= Dumbrăvești =

- Commune
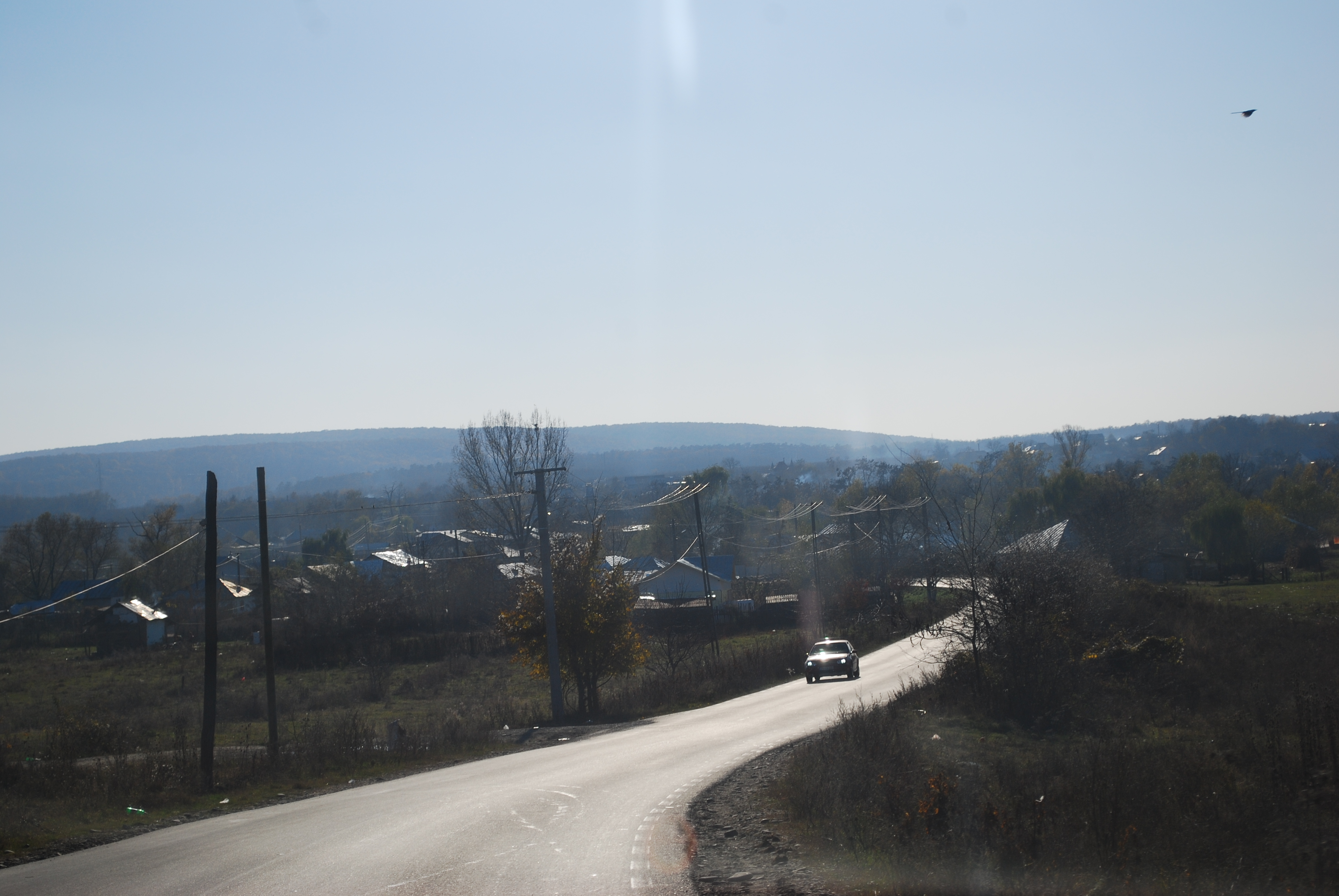
- Plopeni village, seen from the road from Lipănești

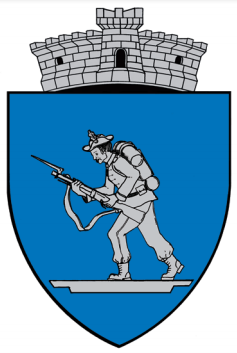
- Coat of arms

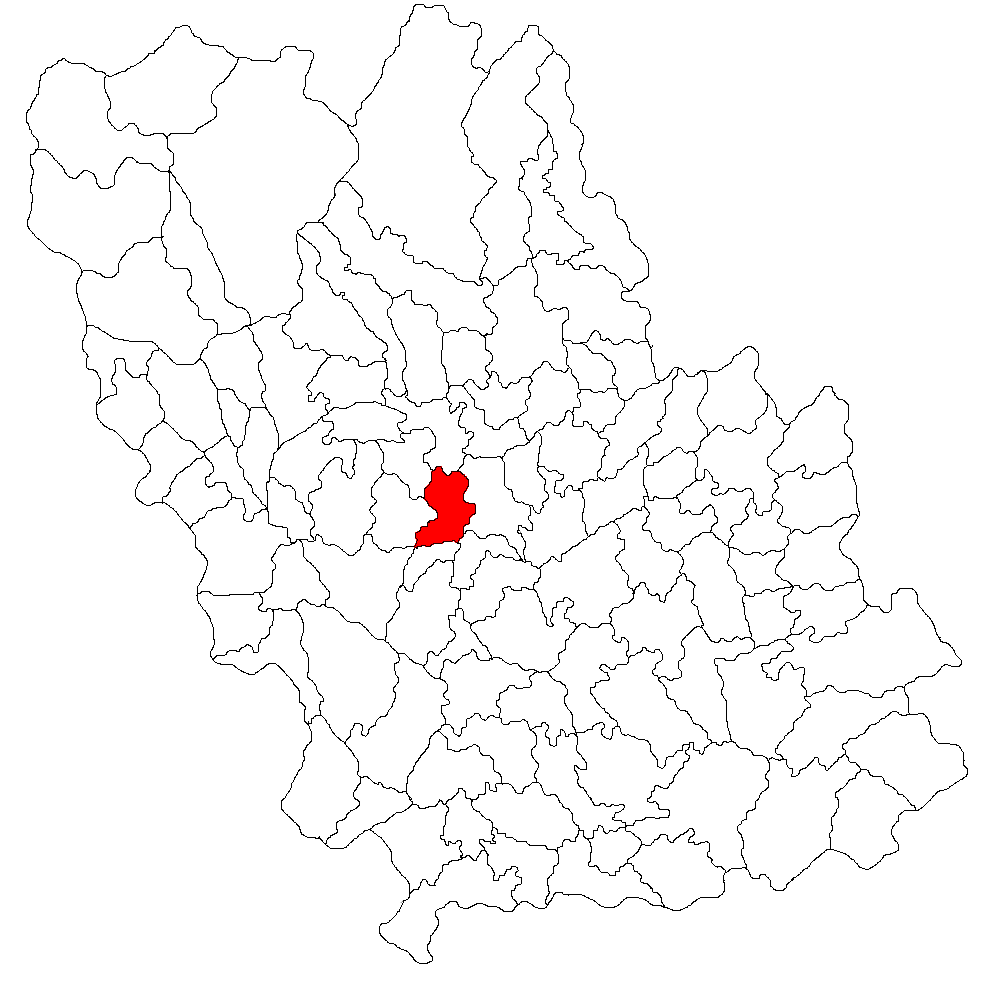
- Location in Prahova County

- Location in Romania
- Coordinates: 45°5′N 26°0′E
- Country: Romania
- County: Prahova

Government
  - Mayor (2024–2028): Dorin-Gabriel Răducanu (PNL)
- Area: 29.95 km^{2} (11.56 sq mi)
- Elevation: 230 m (750 ft)
- Population (2021-12-01): 3,294
  - Density: 110.0/km^{2} (284.9/sq mi)
- Time zone: UTC+02:00 (EET)
  - Summer (DST): UTC+03:00 (EEST)
- Postal code: 107230
- Area code: +(40) 244
- Vehicle reg.: PH
- Website: primariadumbravesti.ro

Dumbrăvești is a commune in Prahova County, Muntenia, Romania. It is composed of six villages: Dumbrăvești, Găvănel, Mălăeștii de Jos, Mălăeștii de Sus, Plopeni, and Sfârleanca.

Historical population
Year	Pop.	±%
1992	3,695	—
2002	3,733	+1.0%
2011	3,537	−5.3%
2021	3,294	−6.9%
Source: Census data

== See also ==
- Castra of Sfârleanca
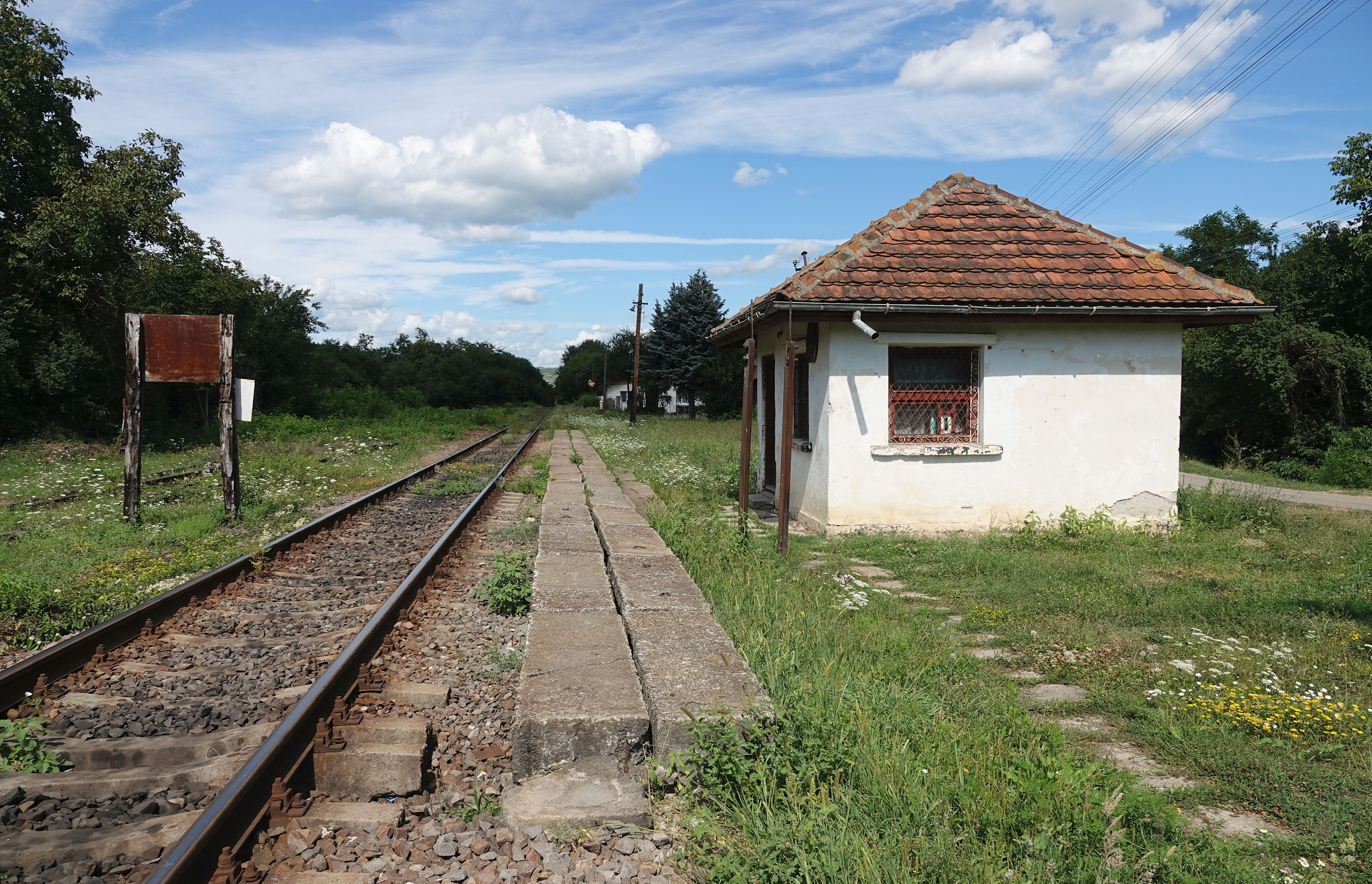
Găvănel train station

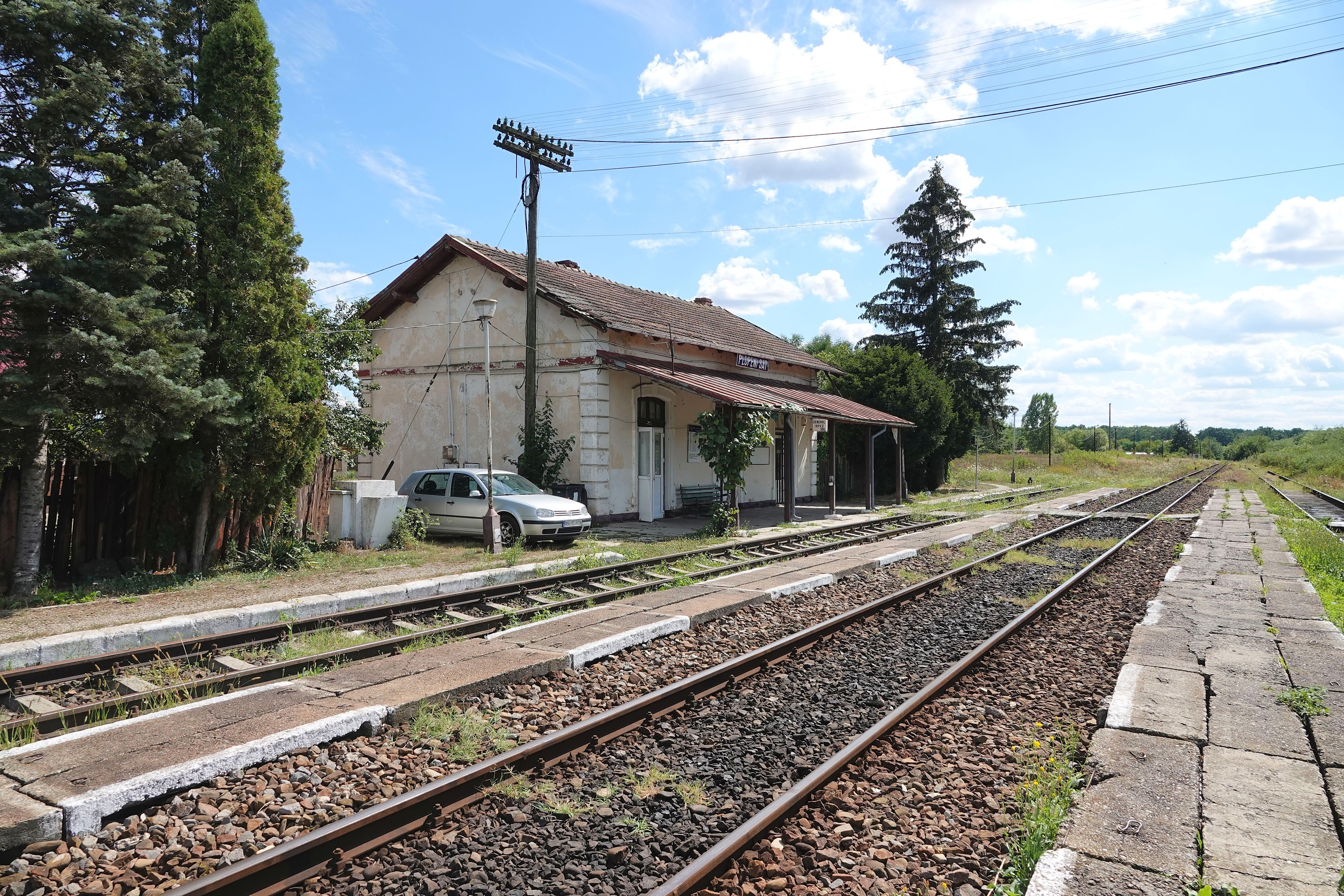
Plopeni train station
