= Pelendava (castra) =

- Castra of Craiova; Pelendoua, Potulatensioi, Polonda
- Location within Romania
- 44°18′N 23°46′E
- Location: Mofleni neighborhood, Craiova, Dolj, Romania

History
- Founded: 2nd century AD

Site notes
- Condition: Ruined

Pelendava was once a fort in the Roman province of Dacia.

== See also ==
- List of castra
