= Castra of Sfârleanca =

Fort in the Roman province of Dacia

- Castra of Mălăiești
- Location within Romania
- 45.091722°N 26.013167°E
- Location: La cetate, Sfârleanca, Prahova, Romania

History
- Founded: 2nd century AD

Site notes
- Elevation: 256 m (840 ft)
- Condition: Ruined

It was a fort in the Roman province of Dacia.

== See also ==
- List of castra
