= Castra of Cornuțel =

Fort in the Roman province of Dacia

- Location within Romania
- 45°25′57″N 22°05′31″E
- Location: Cozlari Hill, Cornuţel, Caraș-Severin, Romania

History
- Founded: 2nd century AD
- Abandoned: 3rd century AD

Site notes
- Condition: Ruined

The castra of Cornuțel was a fort in the Roman province of Dacia. It was erected in the 2nd century AD. The ruins of a nearby contemporary settlement were also unearthed. The castra and the settlement were abandoned in the 3rd century AD. The ruins of the fort are located in Cornuţel (commune Păltiniș, Romania).

== See also ==
- List of castra
