= Castra of Ploiești =

Roman fort

- Location within Romania
- 44.94696°N 26.04529°E
- Location: Rozetei Street, Ploiești, Prahova, Romania

History
- Founded: 2nd century AD
- Abandoned: 2nd century AD

Site notes
- Condition: Ruined

The castra of Ploiești was a Roman fort built in the 2nd century AD. It was abandoned in the same century. Its ruins were unearthed in Ploiești (Romania). Currently, no remains are visible due to the area occupied by the castrum now being a residential area. However, some earthwork-like features can be seen in the uneven surfaces of the roads in the area ("bumps"), and a clearly visible terrace can be observed overlooking the Dâmbu brook (once having a high flow rate, but nowadays reduced to a brook from a river), adjacent to the site.

== See also ==
- List of castra
