= Castra of Târsa =

Roman-era fort

- Castra of Luncani; Castra of Luncani-Târsa
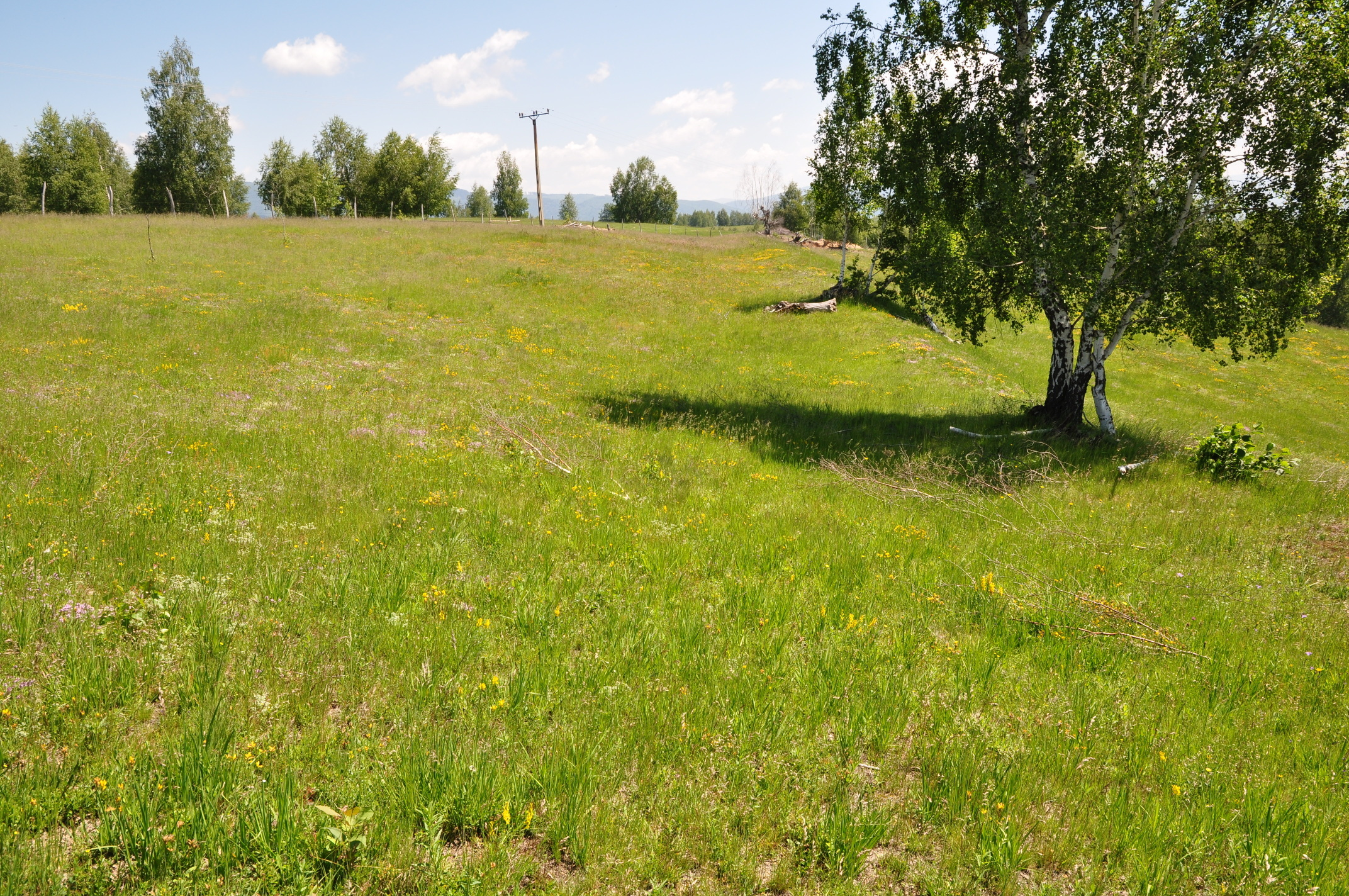
- View of the southern vallum

- Location within Romania
- 45.632662°N 23.158786°E
- Location: Grădiște, Târsa, Hunedoara, Romania

History
- Founded: 1st century AD
- Abandoned: 1st century AD

Site notes
- Elevation: 955 m (3,133 ft)
- Condition: Ruined

The castra of Târsa was a temporary fort erected by the Romans during the Trajan's Dacian Wars (101–102 AD, 105–106 AD).

== See also ==
- List of castra
