= Centum Putei (castra) =

- Castra of Surducu Mare; Castra of Forotic
- Location within Romania
- 45.273528°N 21.599833°E
- Location: Rovină, Surducu Mare, Caraș-Severin, Romania

Site notes
- Elevation: 199 m (653 ft)
- Archaeologists: Dumitru Protase
- Condition: Ruined

Castra Centum Putei was a Roman fort in the Roman province of Dacia, translated as "a hundred wells/mines/pits".

It is located about 1.5 km NE of the village of Forotic in the place called Rovina. The fort is cut into two equal parts by the Surduc - Doclin road.

The fort was built by the soldiers of the Legio IV Flavia Felix near the pre-existing mining town.

The vicus (civil settlement) included the families of the miners who extracted copper.

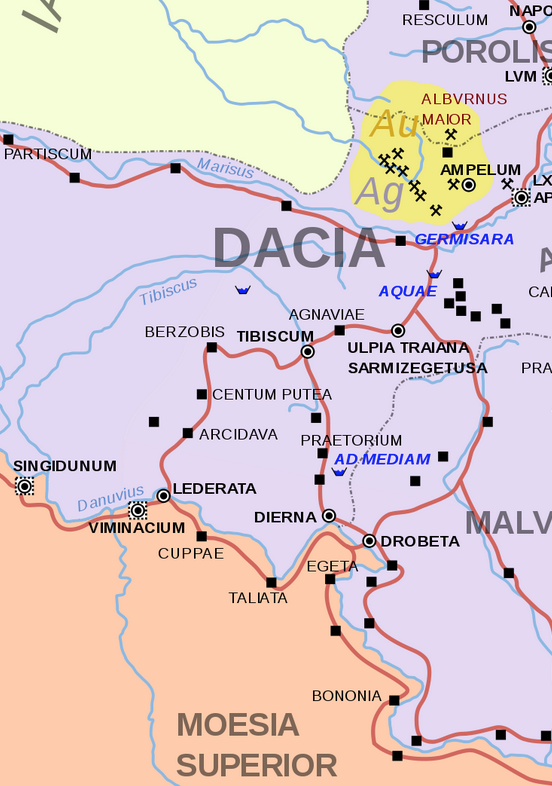
Western Dacia

== See also ==
- List of castra
