= Castra of Chitid =

Fort in the Roman province of Dacia

- Location within Romania
- 45°41′28″N 23°03′45″E
- Location: Dumbrava Hill, Chitid, Hunedoara, Romania

History
- Founded: c. 101-102
- Built: Trajan
- Abandoned: 106?

Site notes
- Condition: Ruined

The castra of Chitid was a short-lived fort erected by the Romans in Dacia before its annexation to the Roman Empire.

== See also ==
- List of castra
