= Pons Augusti (castra) =

- Castra of Voislova
- Location within Romania
- 45°31′N 22°27′E
- Location: Voislova, Caraș-Severin, Romania

History
- Founded: 2nd century AD
- Built: Trajan

Site notes
- Condition: Ruined

Pons Augusti was a fort in the Roman province of Dacia.

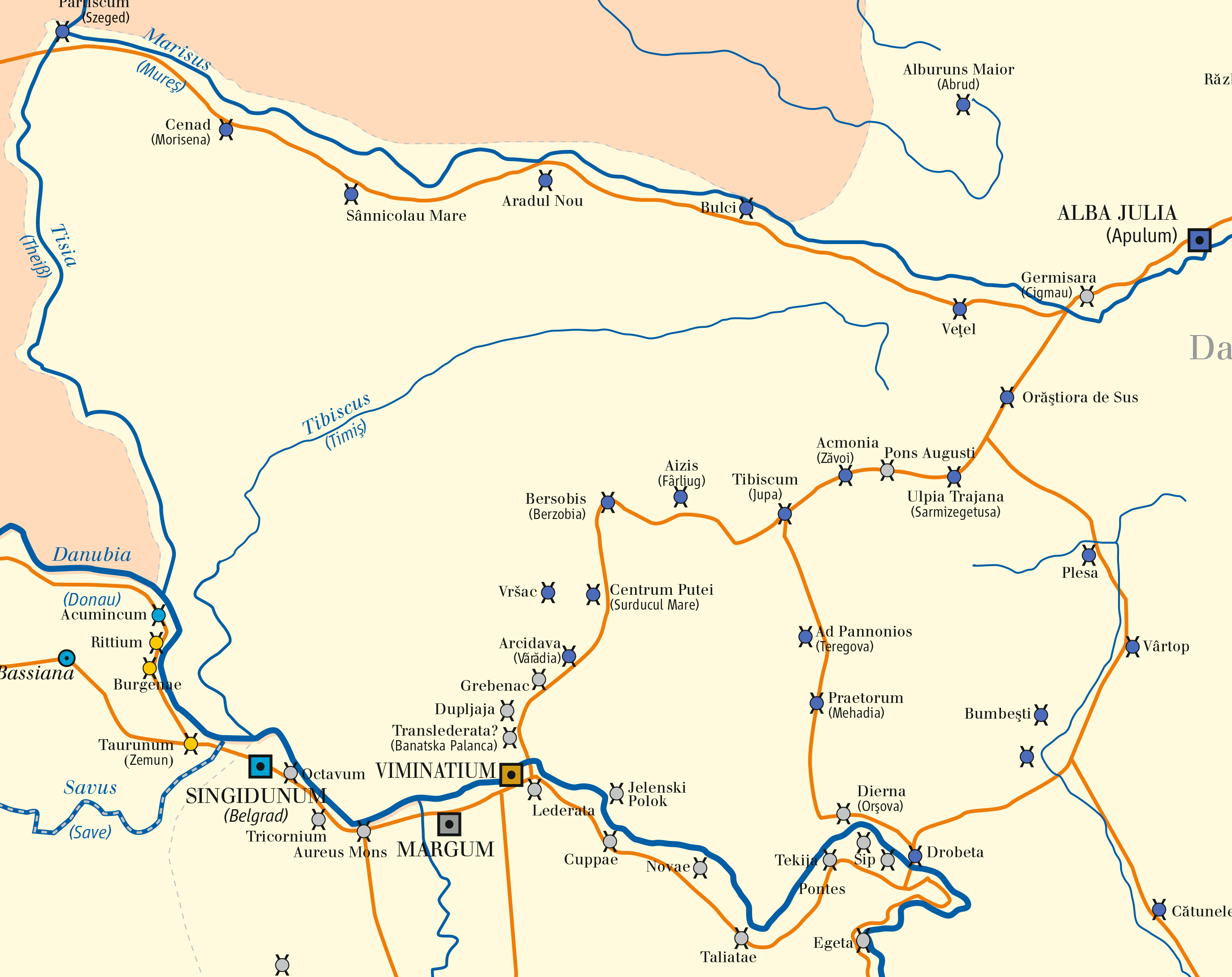
Western Dacia forts

== See also ==
- List of castra
