= Castra of Pietroșani =

Fort in the Roman province of Dacia

- Location within Romania
- 43°42′N 25°37′E
- Location: Pietroșani, Teleorman, Romania

Site notes
- Condition: Ruined

It was a fort in the Roman province of Dacia and is located near the modern settlement of Pietrosani in Romania. Cezar Bolliac is said to have discovered Roman bricks there in 1845. More recent investigations of the site have raised the possibility that it is of pre-Roman origin.

== See also ==
- List of castra
