= Axiopolis (castra) =

Ancient Roman fort

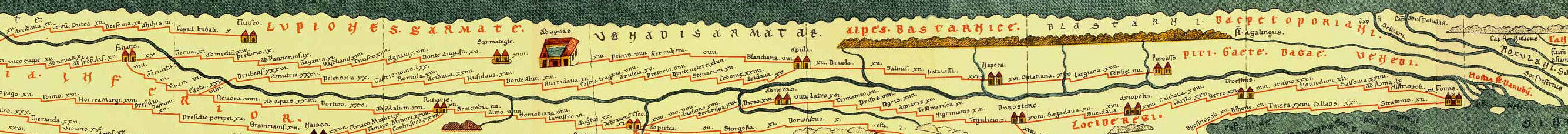
- In Tabula Peutingeriana

- Location within Romania
- 44.331888°N 28.021943°E
- Location: Cernavodă, Constanța, Romania

Site notes
- Elevation: 80 m (260 ft)
- Condition: Ruined

Axiopolis was a fort in the Roman province of Moesia.

It was part of the defensive frontier system of the Moesian Limes along the Danube.

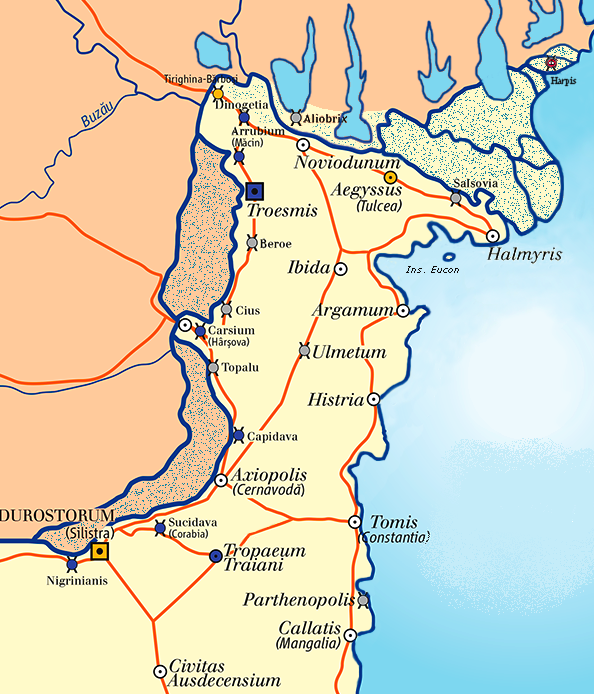
Eastern Moesia and Limes Moesiae

== See also ==
- List of castra
