= Stratonis (castra) =

Heritage site in Constanța County, Romania

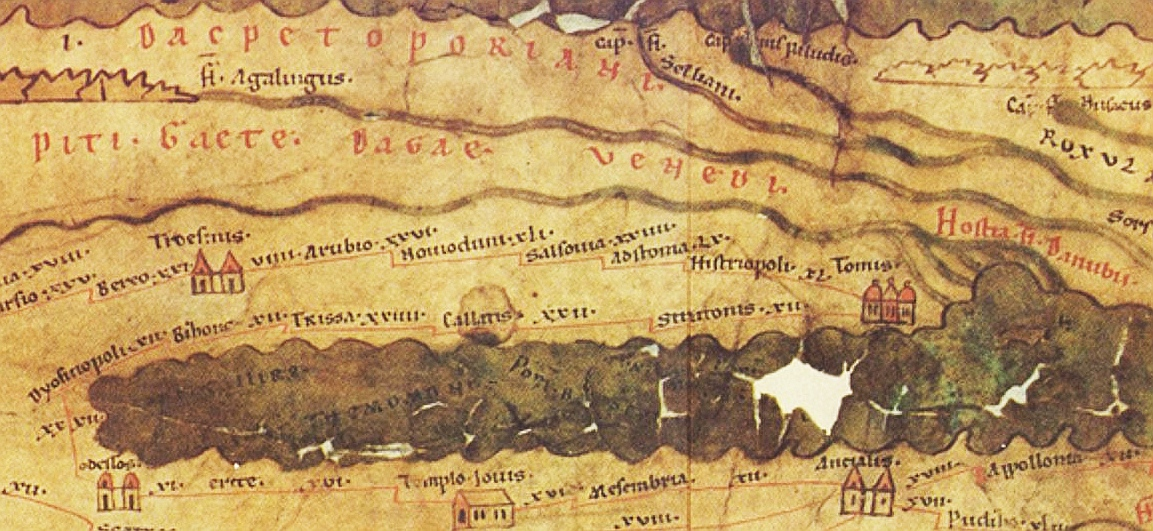
- In Tabula Peutingeriana

- Location within Romania
- 44.02526°N 28.65211°E
- Location: Tuzla, Constanța, Romania

Site notes
- Elevation: 22 m (72 ft)
- Condition: Ruined

Stratonis was a fort in the Roman province of Moesia. As Tabula Peutingeriana shows it is situated between Callatis and Tomis; 22 miles from Callatis and 12 miles from Tomis.

== See also ==
- List of castra
