= Castra of Cristești =

Fort in the Roman province of Dacia

- Location within Romania
- 46°30′37″N 24°29′20″E
- Location: Cristești, Mureș, Romania

History
- Founded: 2nd century AD
- Abandoned: 3rd century AD

Site notes
- Condition: Ruined

Although not unanimously accepted, the existence of the castra of Cristești in the Roman province of Dacia is substantiated by bricks and tiles bearing the name of a Roman military unit, the Ala I Gallorum et Bosporanorum. The lack of any other traces of the Roman fort may easily be due to its destruction by the Mureș River. At Cristeşti, a Roman settlement from the 2nd and 3rd centuries AD was unearthed which was an important center of potters.

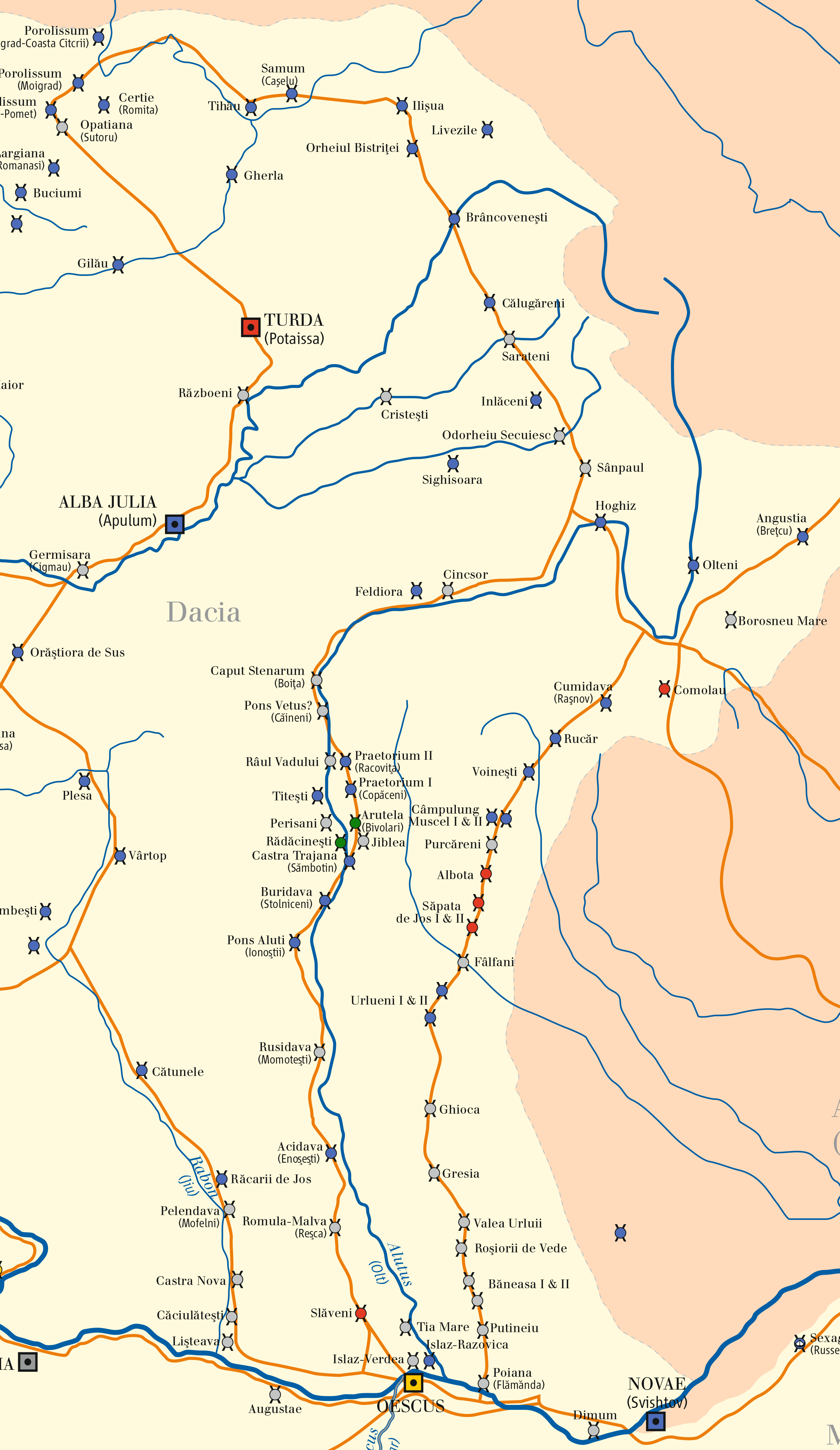
Limes Alutanus + Transalutanus

== See also ==
- List of castra
