= Castra of Răcarii de Jos =

Roman fort in Romania

- Castra of Răcari
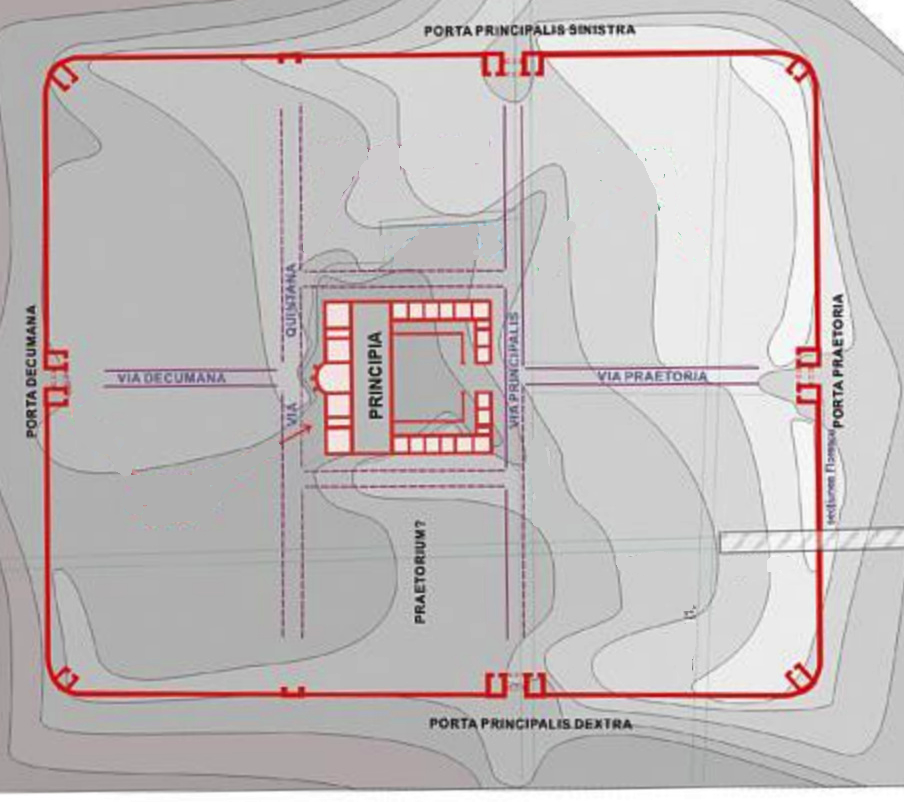

- Location within Romania
- 44.514101°N 23.571889°E
- Location: Răcari, Dolj, Romania

Site notes
- Elevation: 105 m (344 ft)
- Excavation dates: 1897
- Archaeologists: Pamfil Polonic; Dumitru Tudor; Eugen Silviu Teodor; Dorel Bondoc; Nicolae Gudea

Castra of Răcarii de Jos is an ancient Roman fort near the town of Răcari (formerly Răcarii de Jos), near Brădești, Dolj county, Romania. The fort is on the left terrace of the River Jiu and about 70 m SW of the railway station. It probably guarded a military port on the Jiu River.

The fort walls measure 170 x 145 m. Its position far behind the Dacian Limes suggests it was used for policing the centre of present Oltenia.

An adjacent civil settlement (vicus) had an area of up to 40 ha (many times larger than the fort) and lies partly beneath the train station.

Praetorium Plan

== History ==
The fort was originally built during the Dacian Wars (101–102 and 105–106) by a vexillation of the Legio V Macedonica. A larger fort made of earth was built sometime after 157 according to coin founds, and garrisoned by a Numerus Maurorum (i.e. a unit of Moors, probably cavalry). Later, around the year 200, the fort was rebuilt in stone. The stone fort suffered two complete destructions, one in the 220s (under Elagabalus) after which it was rebuilt on the same plan, and a second time during the great Carpic invasion (around 247) when major changes were made to the layout. Coins were discovered up to Decius (r. 249–251) and monetary circulation stopped at 252, but this seems to be general in Oltenia. It is likely that the fort was still occupied until the Roman withdrawal from Dacia in 271.

In the Roman-Byzantine settlement a surprising number of late Roman coins were discovered two of which date from 522 to 527 (Justinian), important because they come from the area of the 2nd–3rd century fort around which the civil settlement developed and thus indicating its continued existence during the 5th–6th centuries. By all appearances, the inhabitants were in touch with the late imperial administration.

== Archaeology ==
The first archaeological excavations were carried out between 1897 and 1898 by Grigore Tocilescu and Pamfil Polonic who discovered rich ceramic and numismatic material, glass objects, bronze, iron, bone, fragments of colossal statues, pieces of military equipment, weapons, fibulae etc.. The discovery of several thousand fragments of bronze statues of three Roman emperors near the perimeter of the castle was remarkable.

Archaeology in 1928 and 1930 produced a report. Research was resumed by the National Military Museum in 1991–92.

From 2003 several annual research campaigns were led by Dr. Eugene S. Teodor of the National History Museum of Romania and Dr. Dorel Bondoc of the Oltenia Museum.

== See also ==
- List of castra

== Sources ==
- Gr. Florescu, Castrul roman de la Răcari-Dolj. Săpăturile arheologice din 1928 şi 1930, Craiova 1931, p. 1–28.
- Nicolae Gostar, Numele antic al aşezării de la Răcari, SCIV 5, 1954, 3–4, 607–610.
- A.T. Laurian, Istriana, Magazin istoric pentru Dacia, II, 1846, p. 65–127.
- E.S. Teodor, D. Bondoc, M. Duţescu, D. Ştefan, S. Răduţă, în Cronica cercetărilor arheologice din România. Campania 2003. A XXXVIII-a Sesiune naţională de rapoarte arheologice, Cluj-Napoca 2004, p. 251–255.
- E.S. Teodor, D. Bondoc, D. Bălteanu, în Cronica cercetărilor arheologice din România. Campania 2004. A XXXIX-a Sesiune naţională de rapoarte arheologice, Jupiter-Mangalia 2005, p. 288–289.
- Gr.G. Tocilescu, Fouilles et recherches archeologiques en Roumanie, Bucureşti 1900.
- D. Tudor, Castra Daciae Inferioris (VIII). Săpăturile lui Gr. G. Tocilescu în castrul roman de la Răcari (raion Filiaşi. Reg. Oltenia), Apulum V, 1965, p. 233–256.
- D. Tudor, Gr.G. Tocilescu şi arheologia Olteniei, SCIVA, 27, 1976, 4, p. 573–579.
- D. Tudor, Oltenia romană, ediţia a patra, Bucureşti 1978.
- C.M. Vlădescu, R. Avram, O. Stoica, L. Amon, Cercetările arheologice în castrul roman de la Răcari. Campania 1991, Oltenia. Studii. Documente. Culegeri, III, 1998, II, 1–2, p. 80–85.
