= Castra of Basarabi-Murfatlar =

Fort in the Roman province of Moesia

- Castra of Basarabi
- Location within Romania
- 44°11′03″N 28°25′40″E
- Location: Basarabi, Constanța, Romania

History
- Founded: unknown
- Abandoned: unknown

Site notes
- Condition: Ruined

The castra of Basarabi was a fort in the Roman province of Moesia. Its remains are located in Murfatlar (Romania).

== See also ==
- List of castra
