= Castra of Cernavodă =

Fort in the Roman province of Moesia

- Location within Romania
- 44°20′N 28°02′E
- Location: Cernavodă, Constanța, Romania

History
- Founded: unknown
- Abandoned: unknown

Site notes
- Condition: Ruined

The castra of Cernavodă was a fort in the Roman province of Moesia. It is located between Ramadan and Purcăreți lakes, northeast of Cernavodă town, on a high promontory, an extension of Dermengiului Hill.

== See also ==
- List of castra
