= Castra of Plosca =

Fort in the Roman province of Dacia

- Location within Romania
- 43°49′8.69″N 23°32′53.10″E
- Location: Pichetul grănicerilor, Plosca, Dolj, Romania

History
- Founded: 2nd century AD

Site notes
- Condition: Ruined

Castra of Plosca was a fort in the Roman province of Dacia.

== See also ==
- List of castra
