= Castra of Drajna de Sus =

Fort in the Roman province of Dacia

- Location within Romania
- 45.261316°N 26.070340°E
- Location: La Grădiște, Drajna de Sus, Prahova, Romania

History
- Founded: 2nd century AD
- Abandoned: 2nd century AD

Site notes
- Elevation: 463 m (1,519 ft)
- Excavation dates: 1983 - 1992; 1994; 1995; 2011
- Archaeologists: Alin Anton; Cristian M. Vlădescu; Florin Topoleanu; Marinela Peneș; Mihail Zahariade; Romeo Avram; Victor Teodorescu; Traian Dvorski
- Condition: Ruined

The castrum of Drajna de Sus was a fort in the Roman province of Dacia.

== See also ==
- List of castra
