= Castra of Hunedoara =

Fort in the Roman province of Dacia

- Location within Romania
- 45°44′56.30″N 22°53′17.93″E
- Location: Dealul Sânpetru, Hunedoara, Hunedoara, Romania

History
- Founded: 2nd century AD

Site notes
- Condition: Ruined

The castra of Hunedoara was a fort in the Roman province of Dacia located on Sânpetru Hill, Hunedoara, Romania.

The garrison was a vexillation of Legion XIII Gemina.

== See also ==
- List of castra
