= Castra of Hinova =

Roman fort in Dacia

- Location within Romania
- 44.54587°N 22.77087°E
- Location: Hinova, Mehedinți, Romania

History
- Founded: 3rd or 4th century AD
- Abandoned: 5th century AD

Site notes
- Condition: Ruined

The castra of Hinova was a Late Roman fort built north of the Lower Danube in the 3rd or 4th century AD. The fort was destroyed for the first time between 378 - 379 AD. In the beginning of 5th century, the fort was destroyed by Huns and finally abandoned by Romans.

== See also ==
- List of castra
