= Castra of Șinca Veche =

Fort in the Roman province of Dacia

- Location within Romania
- 45°45′N 25°10′E
- Location: Șinca Veche, Brașov, Romania

History
- Founded: 2nd century AD

Site notes
- Condition: Ruined

It was a fort in the Roman province of Dacia.

== See also ==
- List of castra
