= List of castra by province =

Castra (Latin, singular castrum) were military forts of various sizes used by the Roman army throughout the Empire in Europe, Asia and Africa. The largest castra were permanent legionary fortresses.

== Locations ==
The disposition of the castra reflects the most important zones of the empire from a military point of view. Many castra were disposed along frontiers particularly in Northern and Central Europe. Another focal point was the Eastern border, where the Roman Empire confronted one of its long-term enemies, the Persian Empire. Other castra were located in strategically important zones, as in Egypt, from which most of the wealth of the empire came. Finally, other castra were located in zones in which the Romans experienced local unrest, such as Northern Spain and Judea. Provinces where the Roman power was unchallenged, such as Italy, Gaul, Africa and Greece, were provided with few or no castra.

In the long history of the Roman Empire, the character of the military policy of the Roman Empire changed, and consequently the location and dimension of the castra changed. Under Emperors Gallienus and Aurelian (and later Diocletian), the Roman army was organized into a high-mobility central army (the comitatus) and in local troops (the limitanei). Some castra lost importance, others were built in new zones, and in general they lost the role of permanent quarter for huge corps of troops.

== Castra by Roman province ==
=== Aegyptus ===
Alexandria, Babylon, Coptos, Nicopolis (Egypt)

=== Africa ===
Ammaedara, Lambaesis, Thamugas, Theveste

=== Arabia Petraea and its limes ===
Betthorus (modern el-Lejjun in Jordan), legionary fortress on the Limes Arabicus where the Legio IV Martia was stationed in the 4th century; Qasr Bshir.

=== Armenia ===
Satala

=== Britannia ===
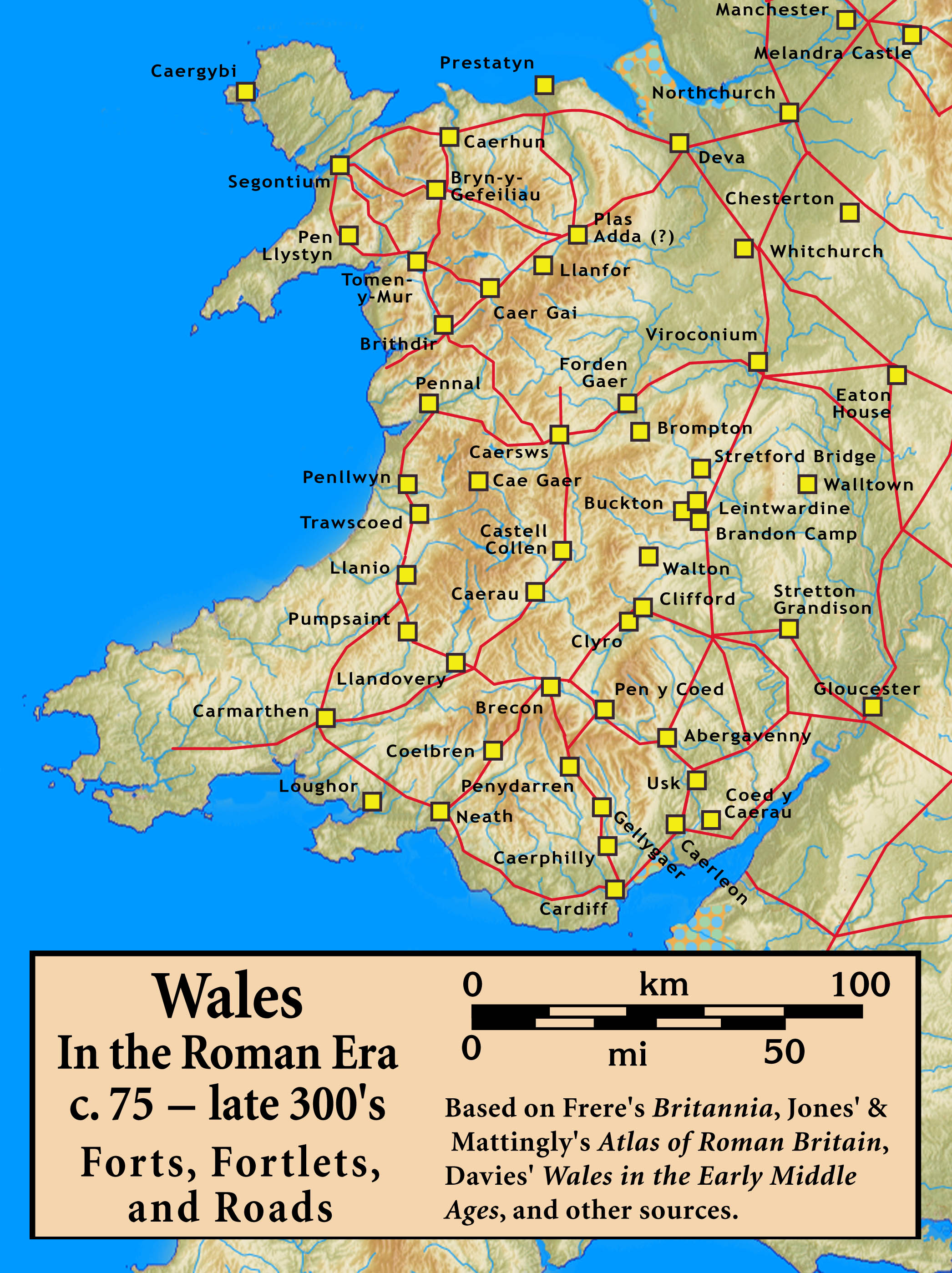
Roman Wales: Forts, Fortlets

Alauna, Arbeia, Banna, Branodunum, Bremenium, Burrium, Camulodunum, Derventio Coritanorum, Derventio Brigantum, Deva Victrix, Eboracum, Epiacum, Glevum, Isca Dumnoniorum, Isca Augusta, Condercum, Concangis, Corinium, Galava, Glannoventa, Leucarum, Lindum, Mamucium, Manduessedum, Mediobogdum, Navio, Morbium, Olicana, Pinnata Castra, Portus Adurni, Regulbium, Segedunum, Trimontium, Vindolanda, Vinovia, Viroconium, Voreda

Also castra of unknown name:
Bar Hill, Bearsden, Lunt Fort, Normandykes, Raedykes, Templeborough

=== Cappadocia ===
Melitene

=== Commagene ===
Samosata, Zeugma

=== Corsica ===
Aleria, Aurelianus

=== Dacia ===
Acidava, Ad Mutrium, Ad Pannonios, Agnaviae, Aizis, Altenum, Angustia, Apulum, Arcidava, Arcobara, Arutela, Auraria Daciae, Bacaucis, Berzovia, Buridava, Caput Bubali, Caput Stenarum, Castra Traiana, Castra Nova, Certinae, Cumidava, Dierna, Drobeta, Jidava, Largiana, Micia, Naissus, Napoca, Optatiana, Partiscum, Pelendava, Pons Aluti, Pons Vetus, Porolissum, Potaissa, Praetoria Augusta, Praetorium (Copăceni), Praetorium (Mehadia), Resculum, Romula, Rupes, Rusidava, Samum, Sucidava, Tibiscum, Ulpia Traiana Sarmizegetusa

Also castra of unknown Roman name:
Albești, Bădeni, Băile Homorod, Boroșneu Mare, Brusturi, Brâncovenești, Bucium, Buciumi, Bulci, Bumbești-Jiu - Gară, Bumbești-Jiu - Vârtop, Băneasa, Bănița, Chitid, Cigmău, Cincșor, Cioroiu Nou, Colțești, Constantin Daicoviciu, Cornuțel, Cristești, Crâmpoia, Călugăreni, Desa, Duleu - Cornet cetate, Duleu - Odăi, Federi, Feldioara, Fizești, Fâlfani, Gherla, Gilău, Gresia, Hinova, Hoghiz, Hunedoara, Ighiu, Islaz, Izbășești, Izvoarele, Jac, Livezile, Luncani / Târsa, Moldova Nouă, Negreni, Ocna Sibiului, Olteni, Odorheiu Secuiesc, Orheiu Bistriței, Pietroasele, Pietroșani, Ploiești, Plosca, Poiana, Pojejena, Porceni, Purcăreni, Putineiu, Puținei, Roșiorii de Vede, Râu Bărbat, Răcarii de Jos, Războieni-Cetate, Reci, Salcia, Sfârleanca, Sighișoara, Slăveni, Stremț, Surducu Mare, Sânpaul (Harghita), Sânpaul (Mureș), Săpata de Jos, Sărățeni, Sfârleanca, Tihău, Titești, Târnăveni, Urlueni, Voinești, Voislova, Șinca Veche, Zăvoi

Possible castra mentioned on Tabula Peutingeriana but not investigated:
Ad Aquas/Aquae, Brucla, Gaganis, Masclianis, Petris, Salinae/Salinis

=== Dalmatia ===
Delminium, Burnum, Ragusia or Laus, Tilurium, Split

=== Gallia ===
Argentoratum, Castra Constantia, Lugdunum

Also castra of unknown name:
Oudenburg

=== Germania ===
Abusina, Augusta Vindelicorum, Bonna, Colonia Agrippinae, Flevum, Moguntiacum, Novaesium, Noviomagus, Traiectum, Vetera

Also castra of unknown name:
Saalburg

=== Hispania ===
Asturica Augusta, Castra Servilia, Legio, Lucus Augusti, Tarraco

=== Italia ===
Castra ad Fluvium Frigidum, Castra Albana, Castra Nova equitum singularium, Castra of ancient Rome, Castra Peregrina, Castra Praetoria, Cremona, Emona, Castra Taurinorum, Placentia

=== Judaea ===
See also Syria Palaestina. Included here are the Galilee and Perea.

Legio, Aelia Capitolina, Raphana

=== Mesopotamia ===
Nisibis, Singara, Ziata

=== Moesia ===
Ad Stoma, Aliobrix, Altinum, Argamum, Arrubium, Axiopolis, Beroe, Callatis, Capidava, Carsium, Cius, Dinogetia, Drajna de Sus, Histriopolis, Halmyris, Libida, Novae, Noviodunum, Oescus, Ratiaria, Sacidava, Salsovia, Scupi, Singidunum, Stratonis, Tomis, Troesmis, Ulmetum, Viminacium

Also castra of unknown name:
Basarabi-Murfatlar, Tirighina-Bărboși, Cernavodă

=== Noricum ===
Asturis (Zwentendorf), Cannabiaca (Zeiselmauer-Wolfpassing), Comagena, Lauriacum, Lentia

=== Osrhoene ===
Circesium

=== Pannonia ===
Aquincum, Brigetio, Carnuntum, Mursa, Poetovio, Sirmium, Taurunum, Vindobona

=== Raetia ===
Brigantium, Castra Regina, Batavis, Castra Maiense

=== Maxima Sequanorum ===
Augusta Raurica, Vindonissa

=== Syria ===
Androna, Apamea, Bostra, Dura, Emesa

== See also ==
- List of ancient cities in Thrace and Dacia
