= Castra of Sânpaul (Harghita) =

Fort in the Roman province of Dacia

Castra of Sânpaul (Harghita County)
- Location within Romania
- 46°11′46.98″N 25°22′54.22″E
- Location: Sânpaul, Harghita, Romania

History
- Founded: 2nd century AD

Site notes
- Condition: Ruined

It was a fort in the Roman province of Dacia.

== See also ==
- List of castra
