= Micia =

- Castra of Mintia; Castra of Vețel
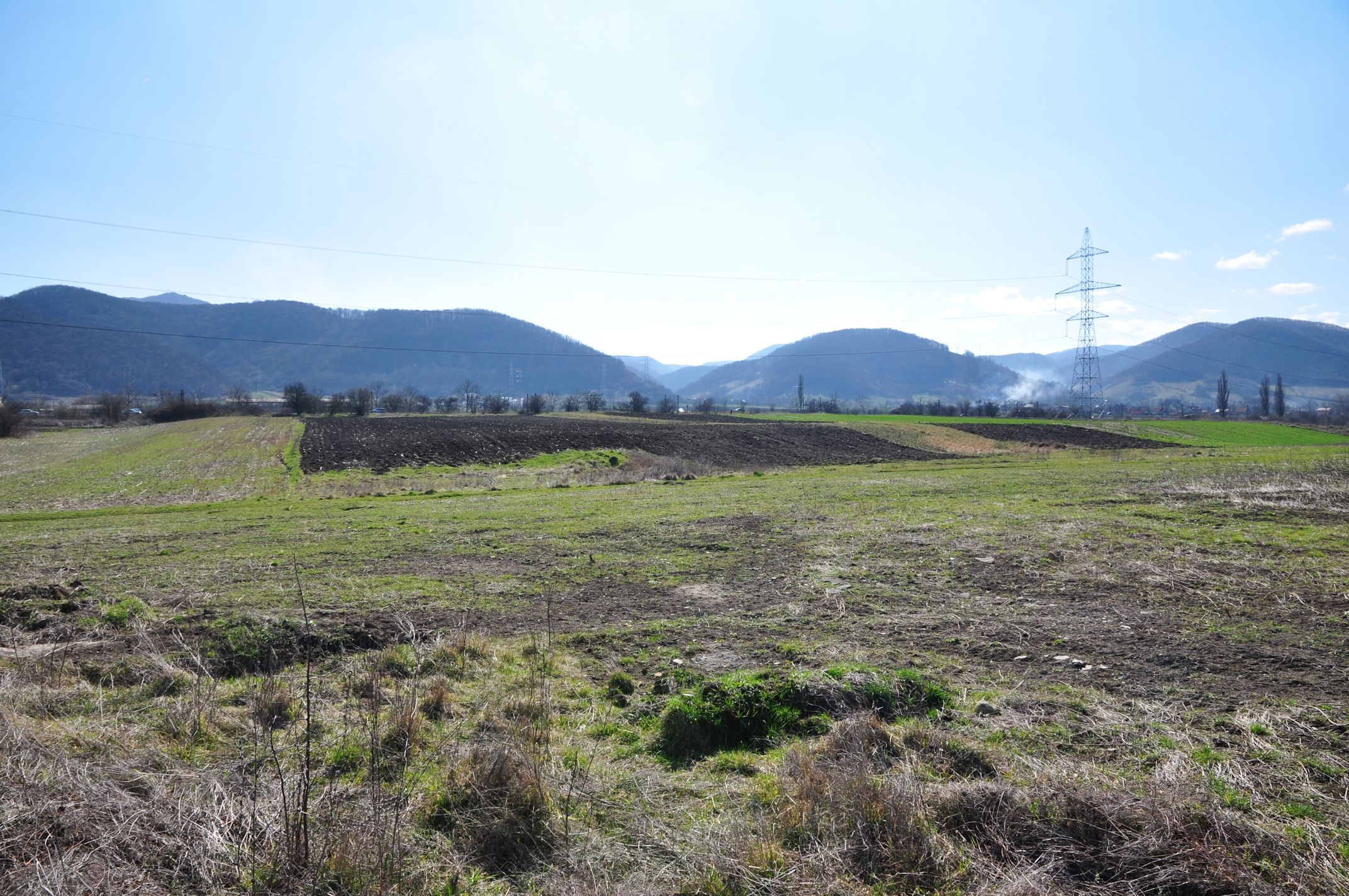

- Location within Romania
- 45.911806°N 22.815278°E
- Location: Vețel, Hunedoara, Romania

History
- Founded: 2nd century AD
- Abandoned: c. 4th–5th century AD

Site notes
- Elevation: 186 m (610 ft)

Micia was initially a large Roman fort for auxiliary troops outside which a large town developed. The archaeological site is located in the commune of Vețel, Hunedoara County in Transylvania, Romania.

It was important as it monitored and secured the road to the centre of Transylvania and the river route along the frontier to Partiscum, today Szeged, Hungary as well as supervising the adjacent mining area. In addition, there was a strategically important river port.

In the civil settlement were large baths and a small amphitheatre. The large number of ancient inscriptions are significant.

Every year a Roman reenactment festival, Micia Rediviva, is held on the archaeological site.

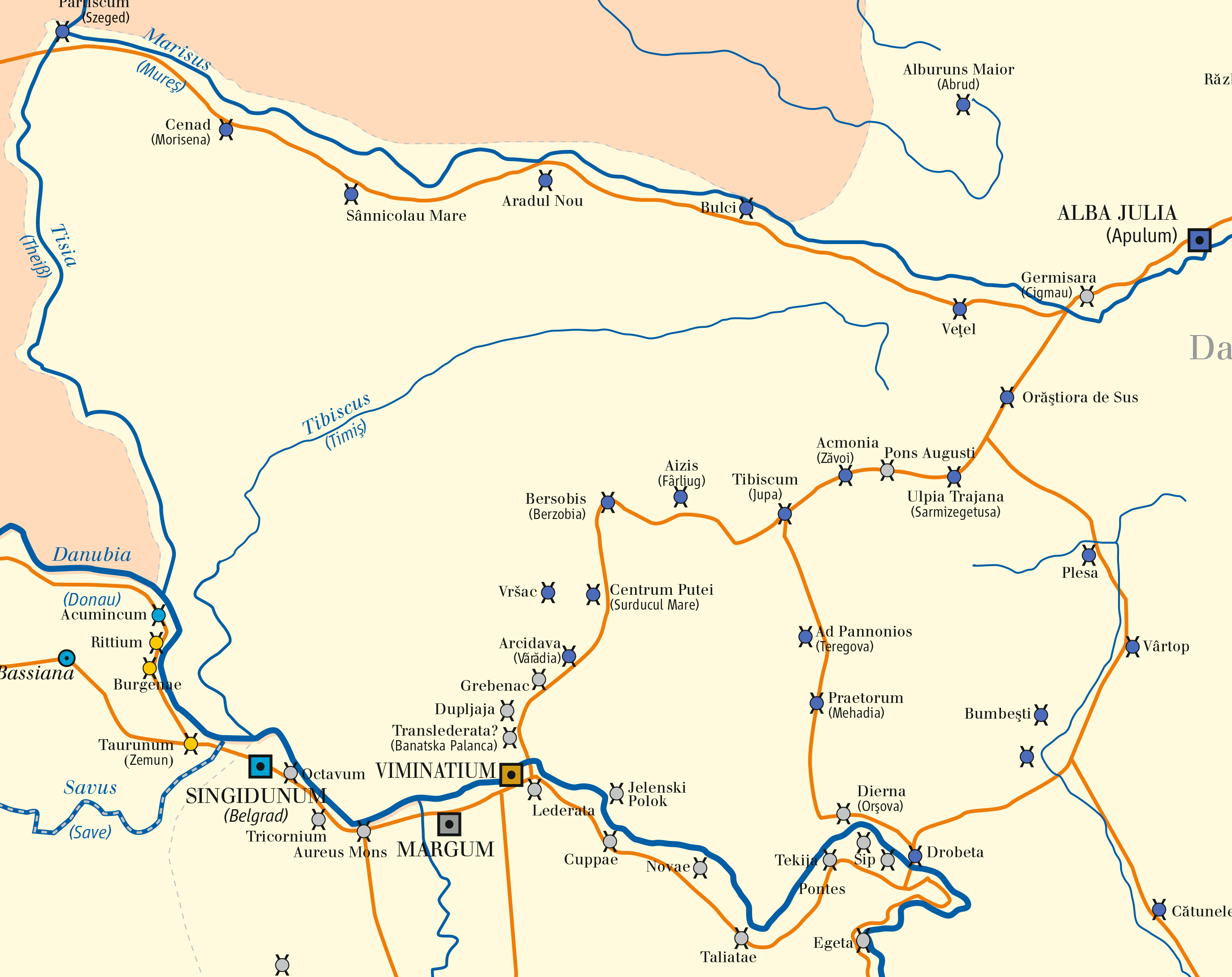
Western Dacia forts

== Castra ==
It had a quadrilateral shape of 360 x 180 m placed unusually with the long sides to the east/west unlike traditionally with the narrow side facing the enemy. It lies across the modern road and railway.

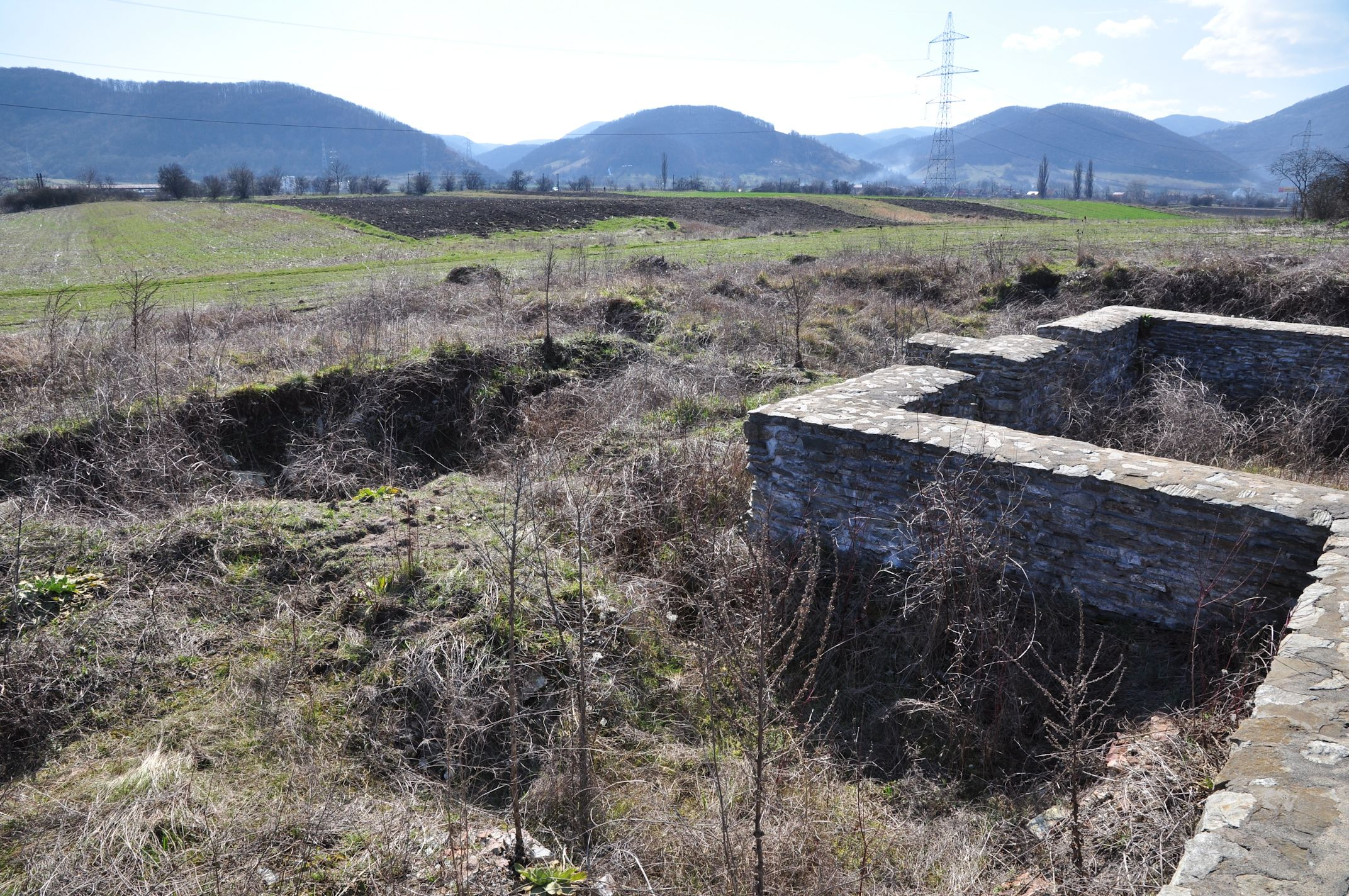
View from thermae (2014)

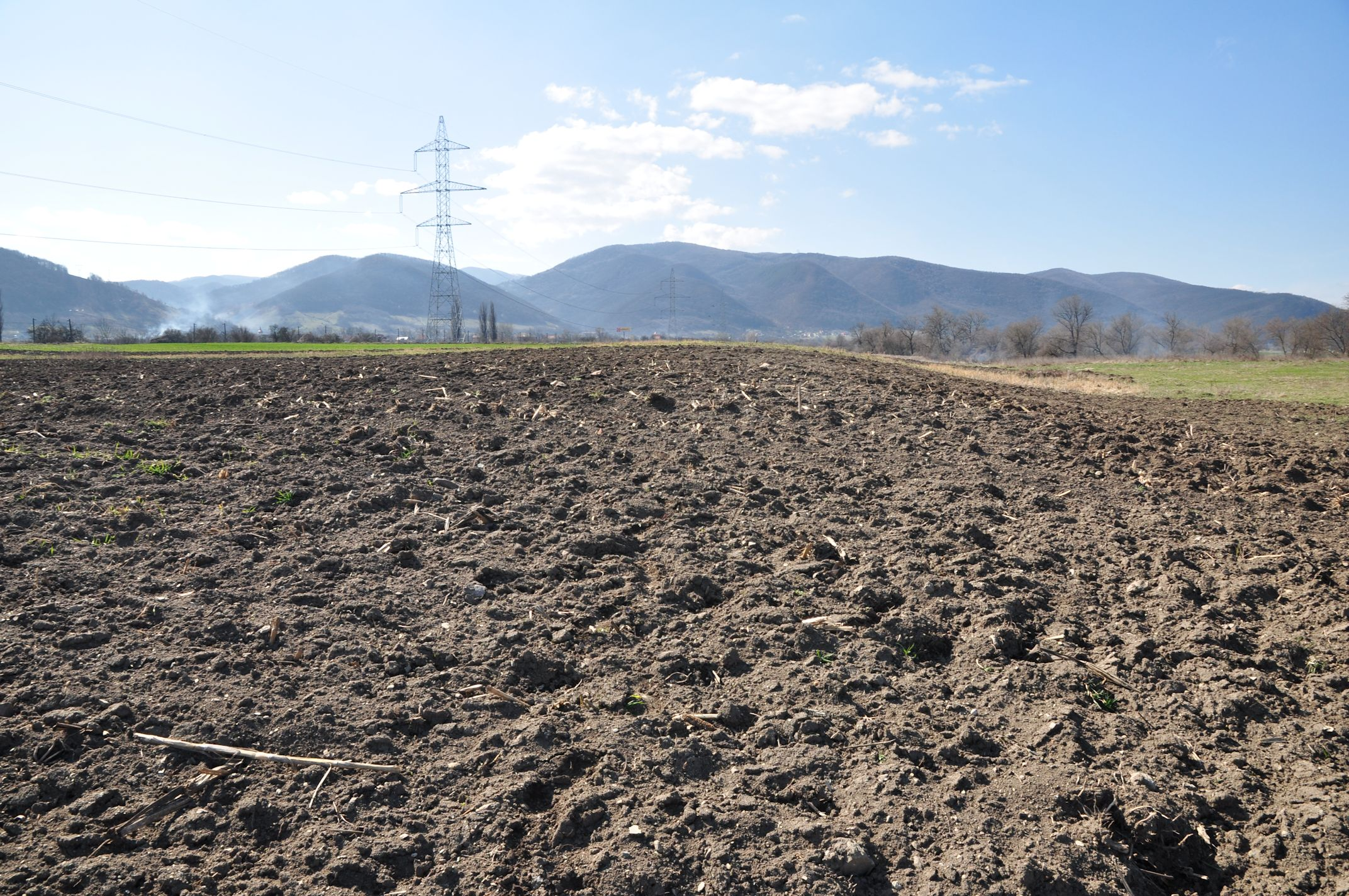
Nordic vallum of the fort (2014)

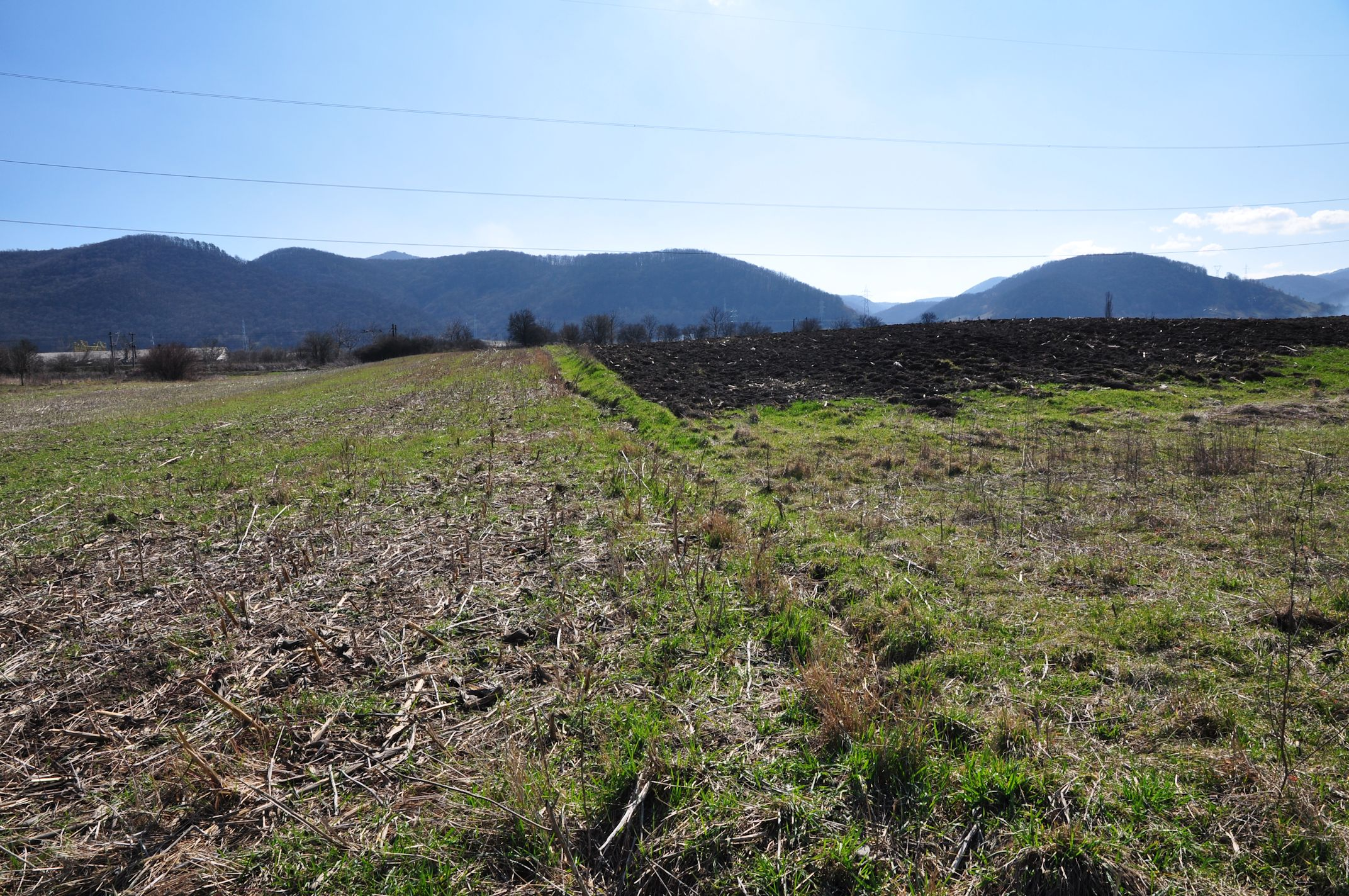
Eastern vallum of the fort (2014)

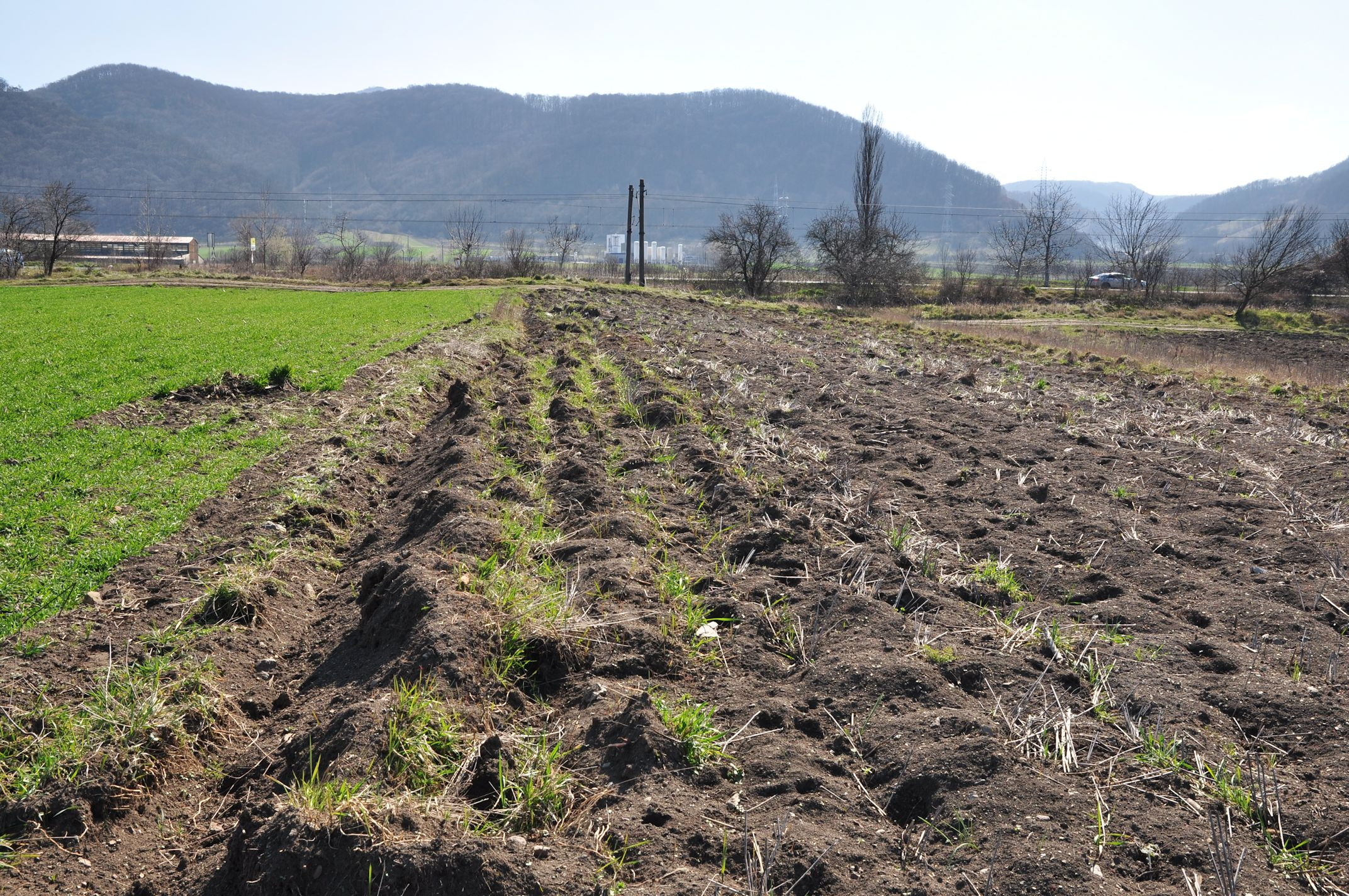
Western vallum of the fort (2014)

The plan of castra

== Vicus ==
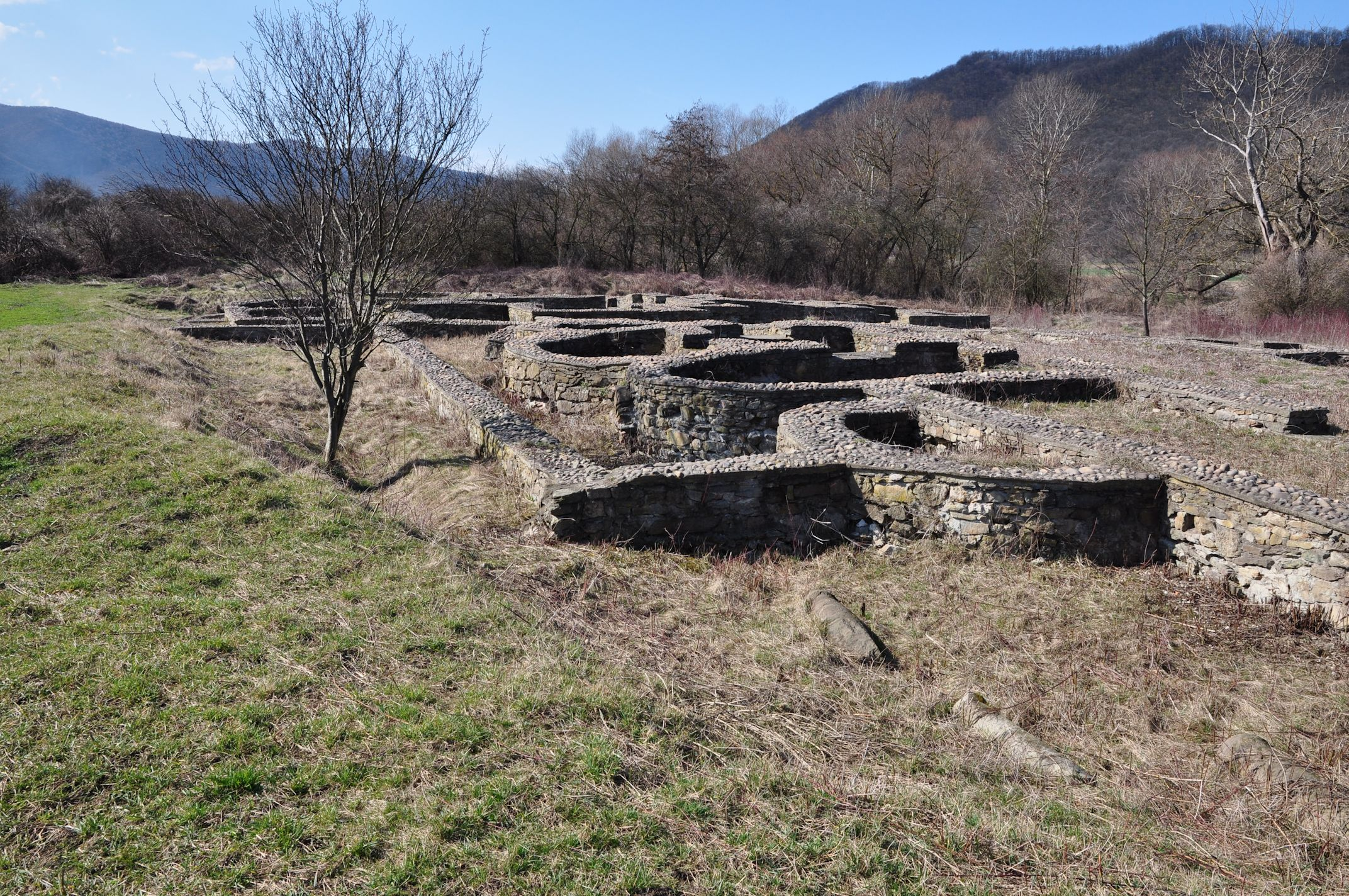
Buildings (2014)

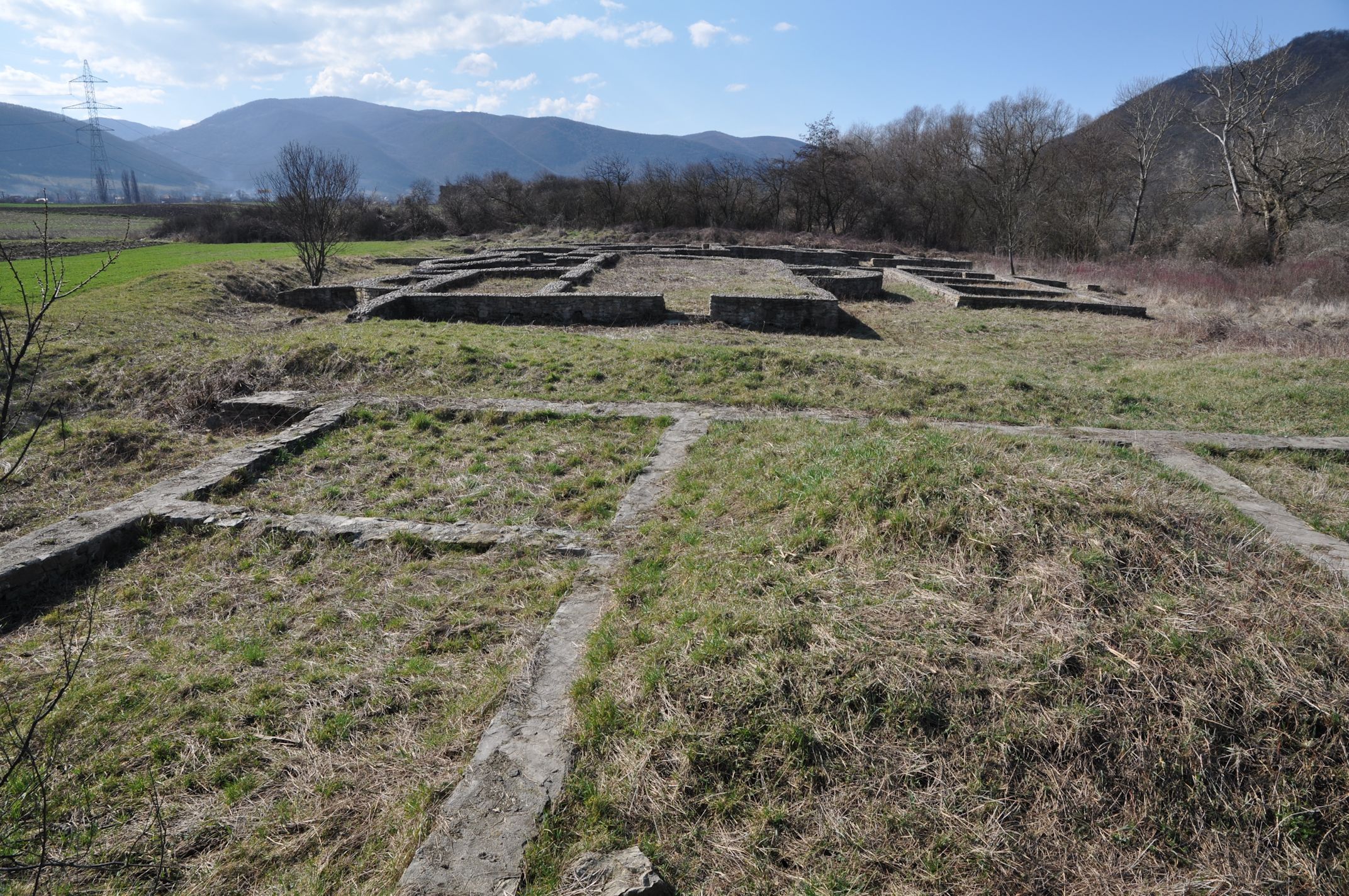
Buildings (2014)

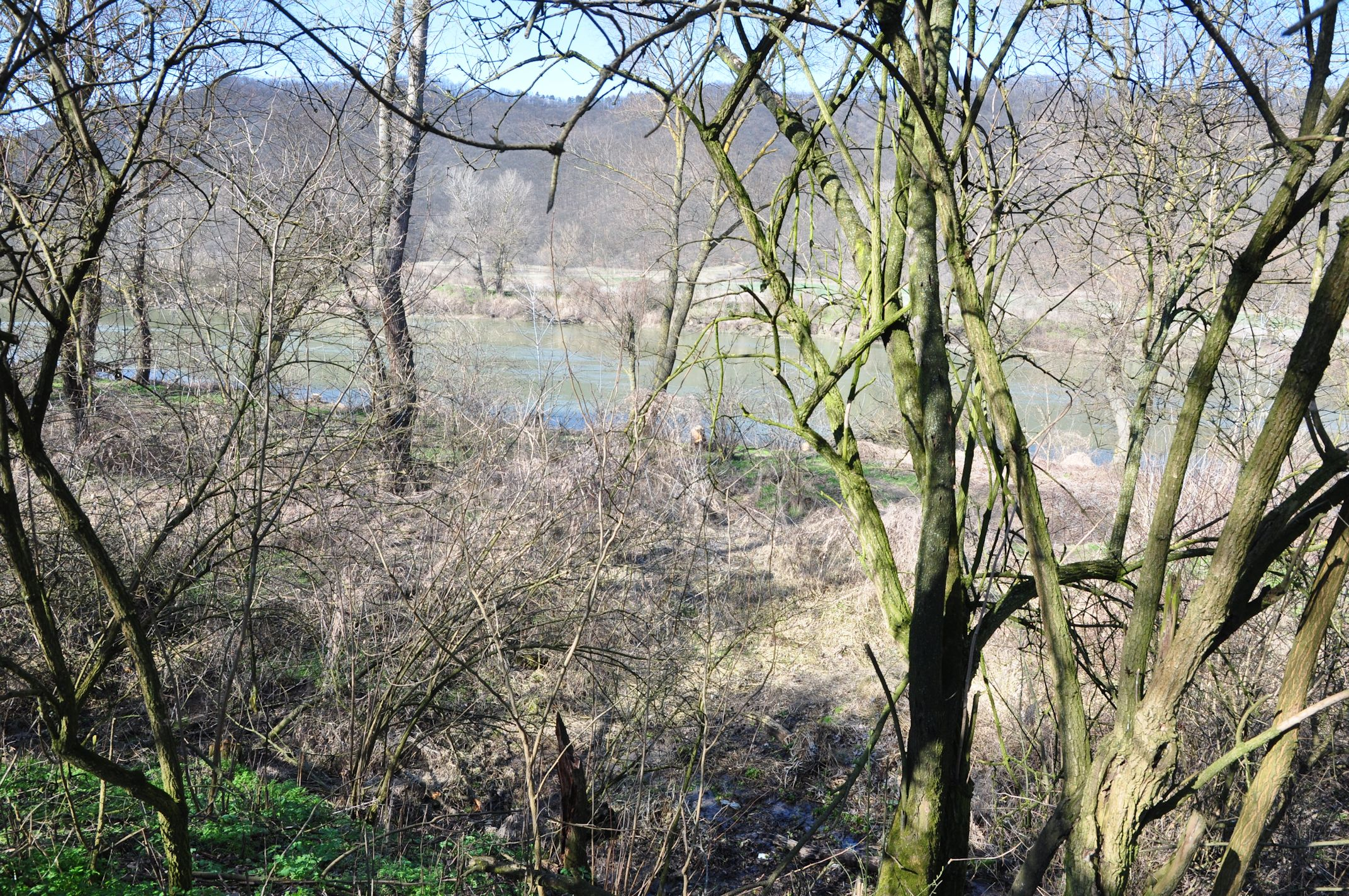
The Marisus river north of the vicus (2014)

== Thermae ==
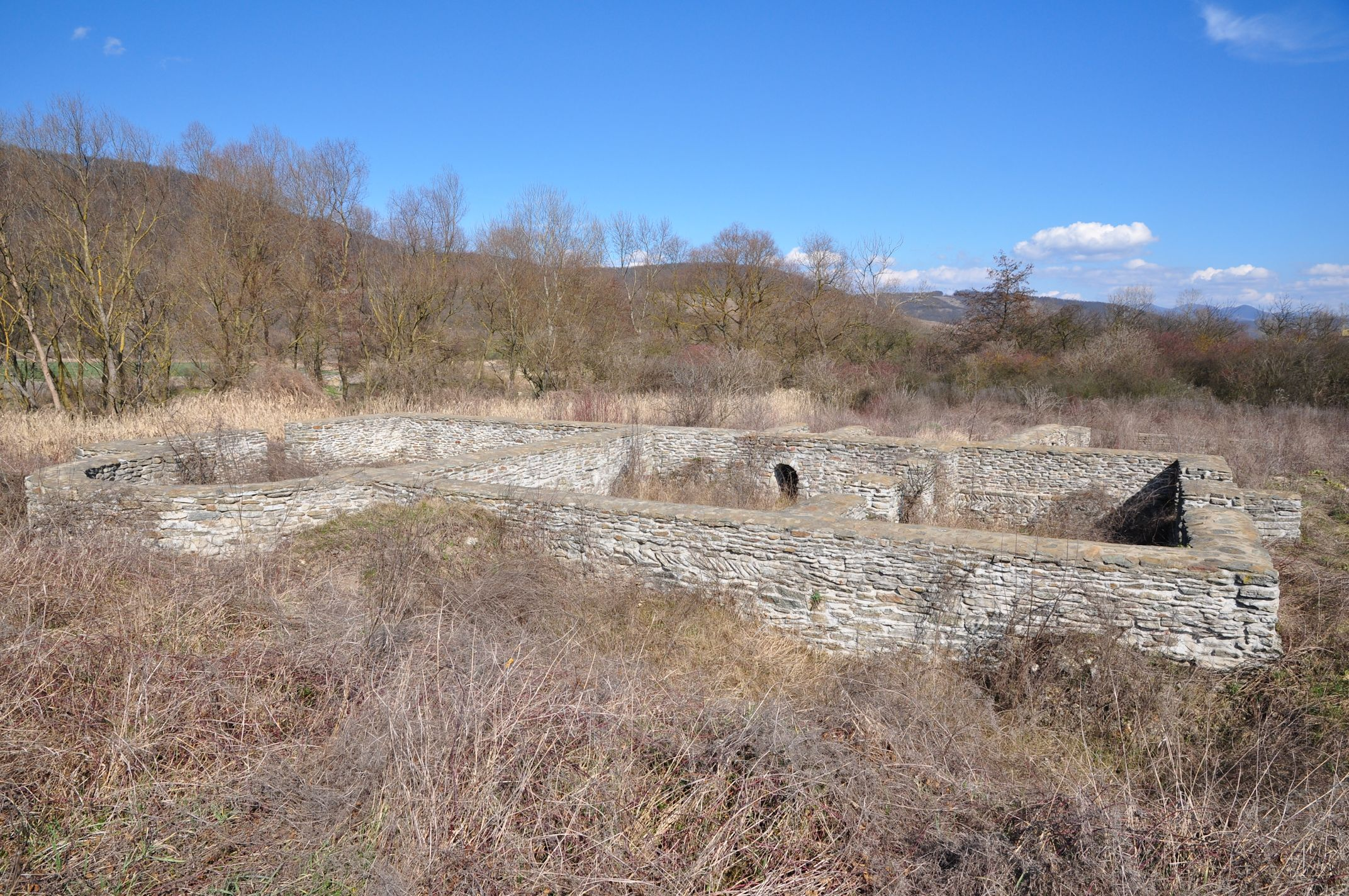
Thermae (2014)

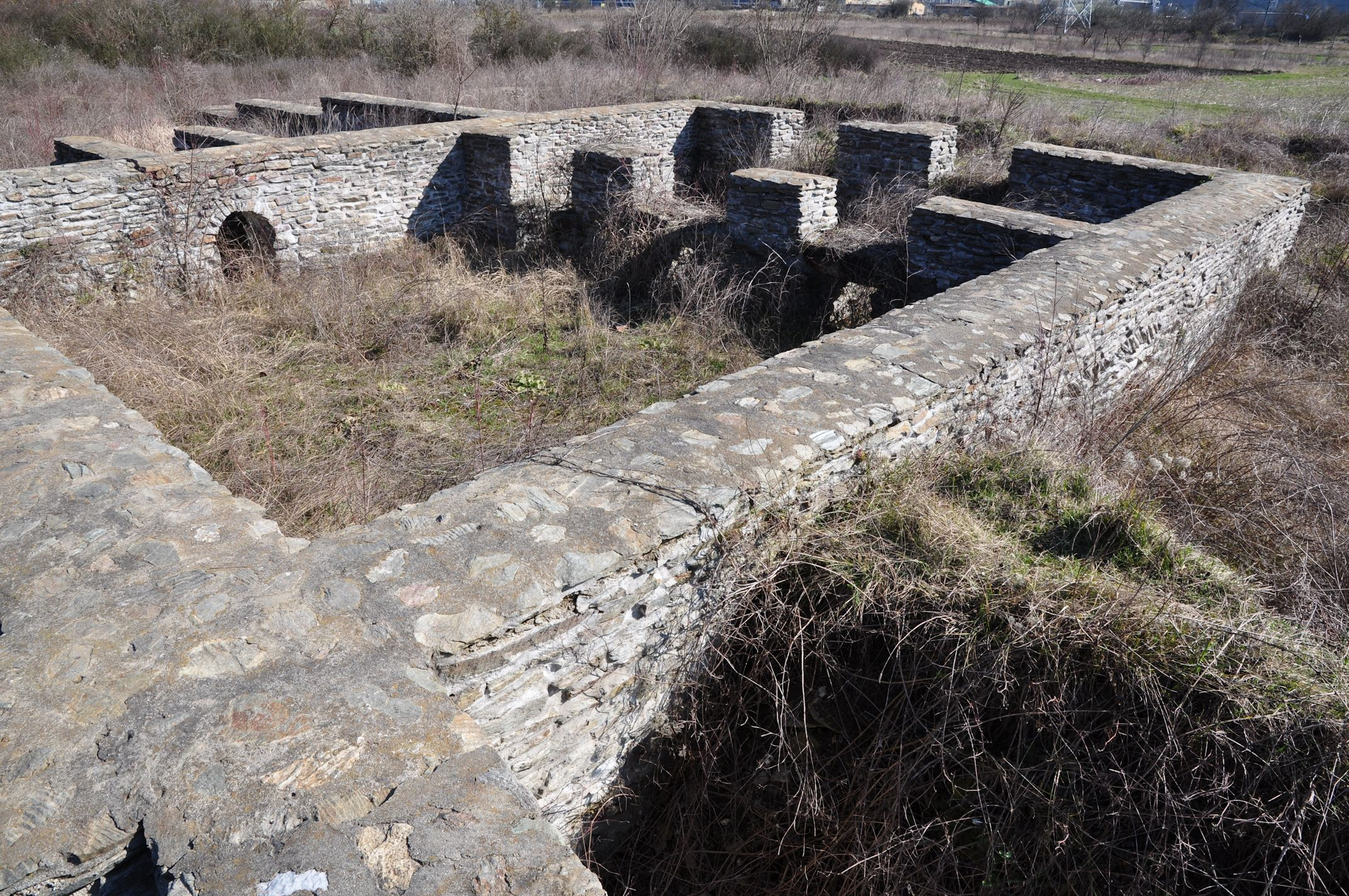
Thermae (2014)

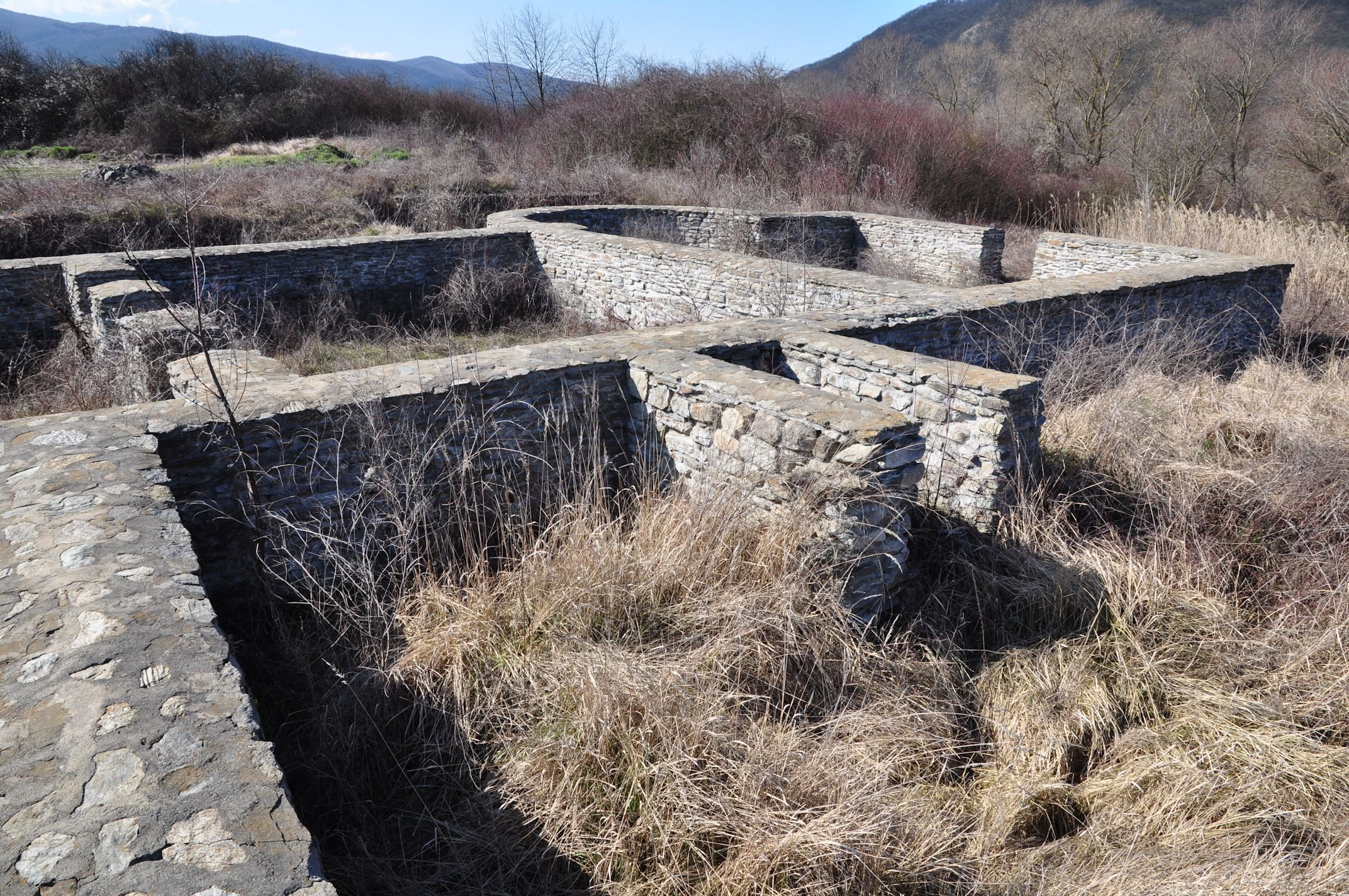
Thermae (2014)

== Amphitheatre ==
100 m to the southeast of the military bath is a small amphitheatre with a circumference of 104 m. The arena was of diameter 31 × 29 m.

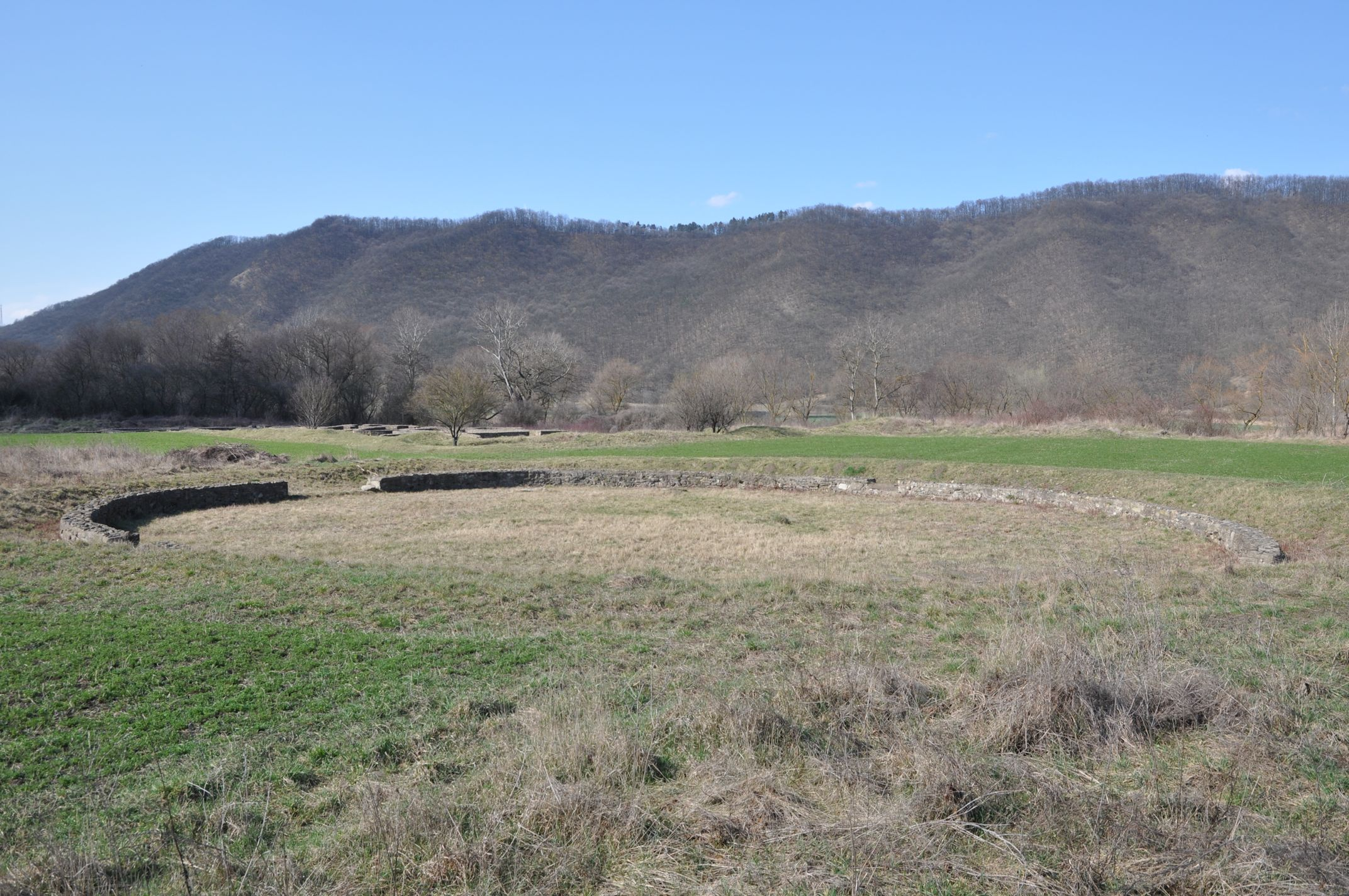
amphitheatre (2014)

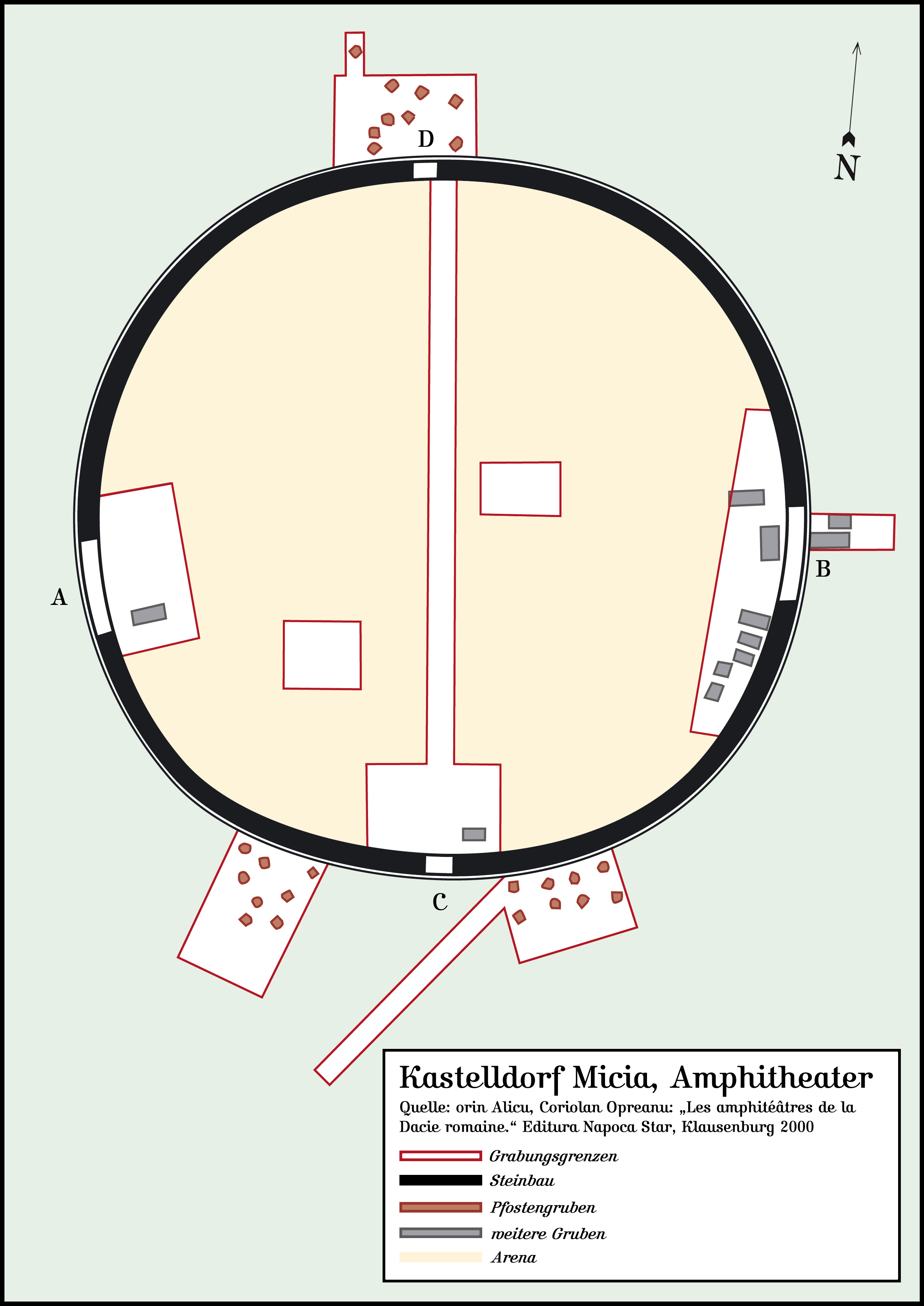
plan of amphitheatre

== Necropolis ==
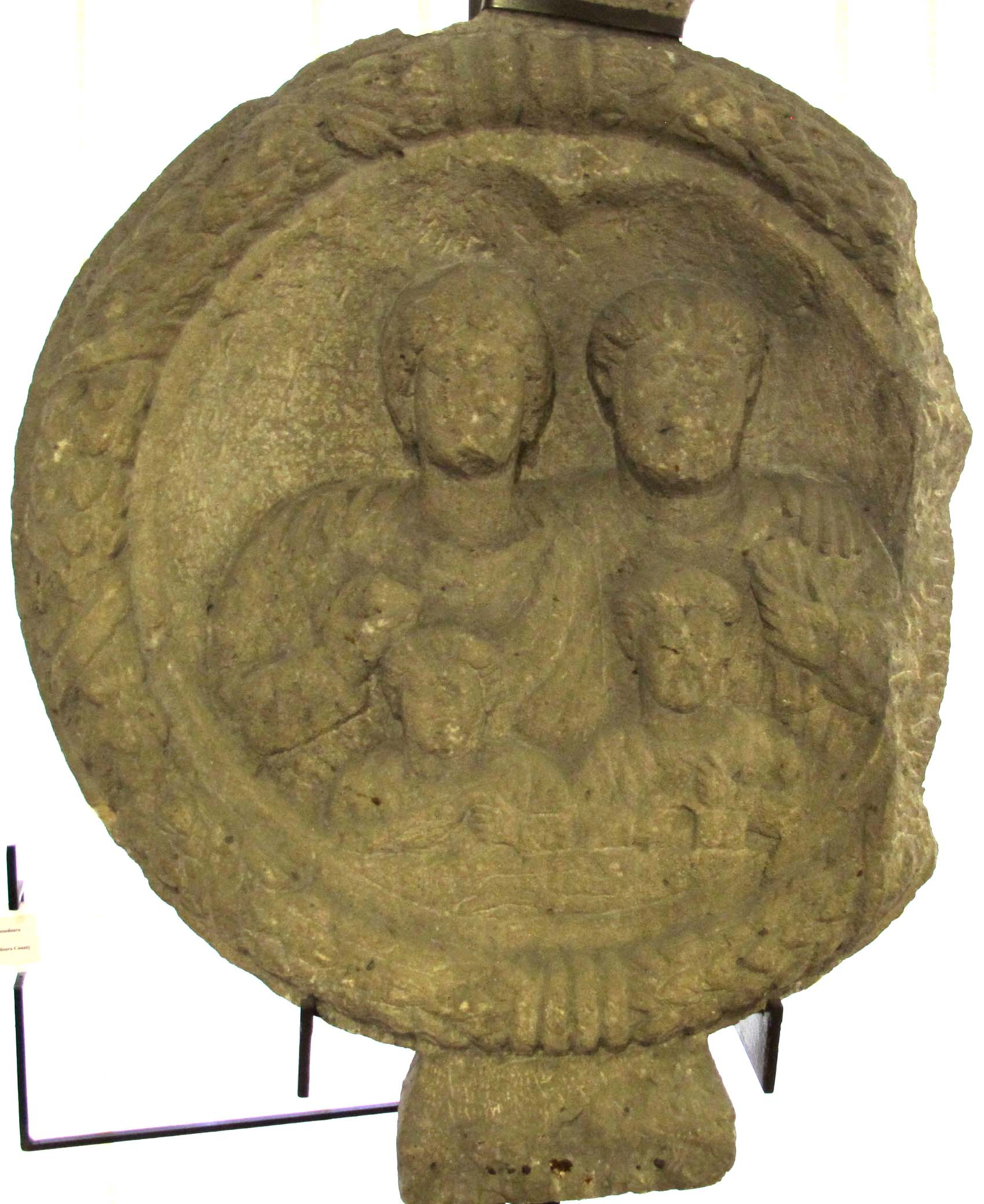
Funerary monument, 2nd century AD.

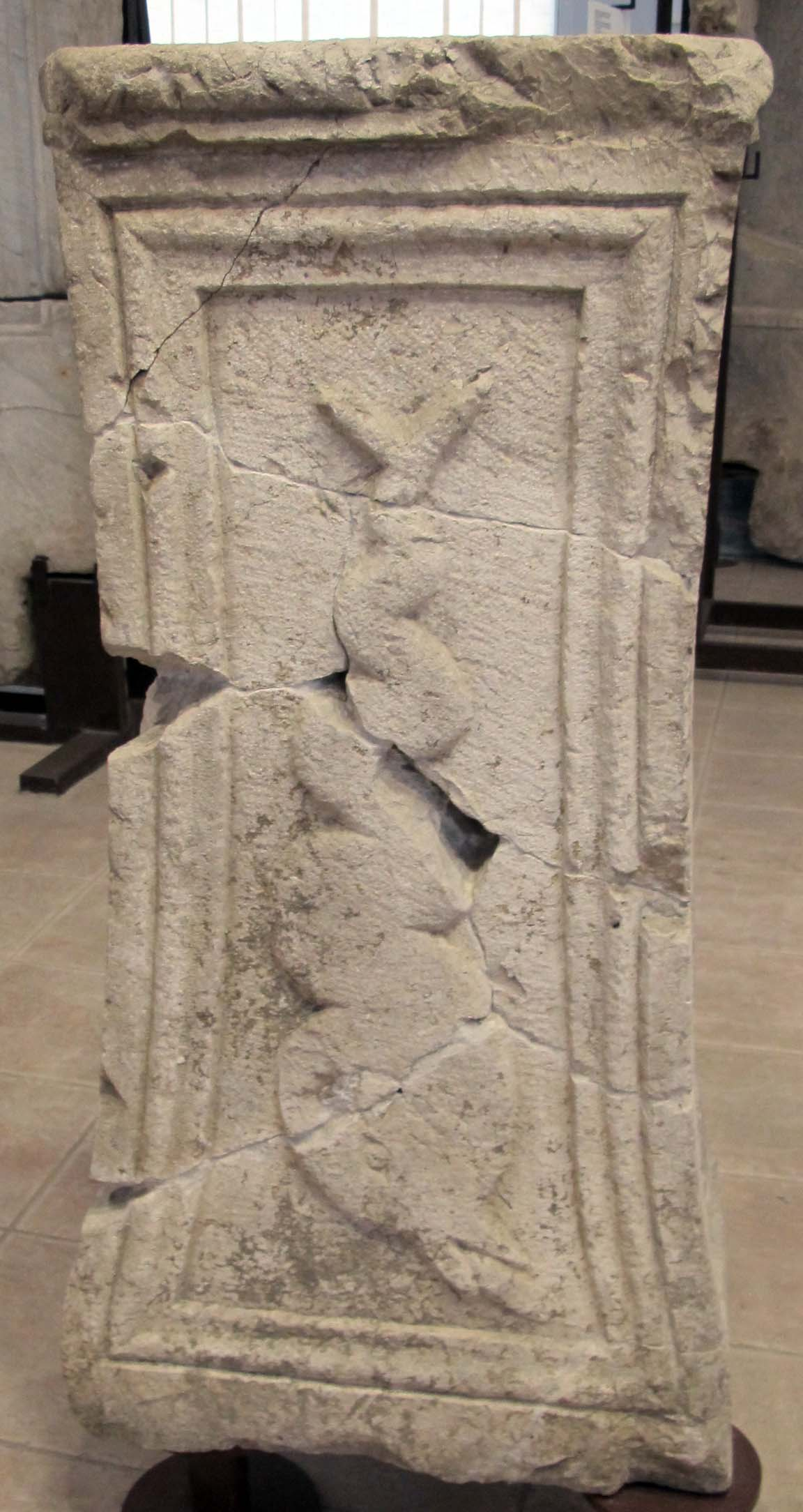
Funerary monument, 2nd century AD.

== See also ==
- List of castra
