= Castra Nova, Dacia =

Fort in the Roman province of Dacia

Coordinates: 44°07′N 24°00′E

Castra Nova
- Castris Novis
- Location within Romania
- Location: Valea fântânii, Castranova, Dolj, Romania

Site notes
- Condition: Ruined

Castra Nova was a fort in the Roman province of Dacia.

== See also ==
- List of castra
