= Tomis (castra) =

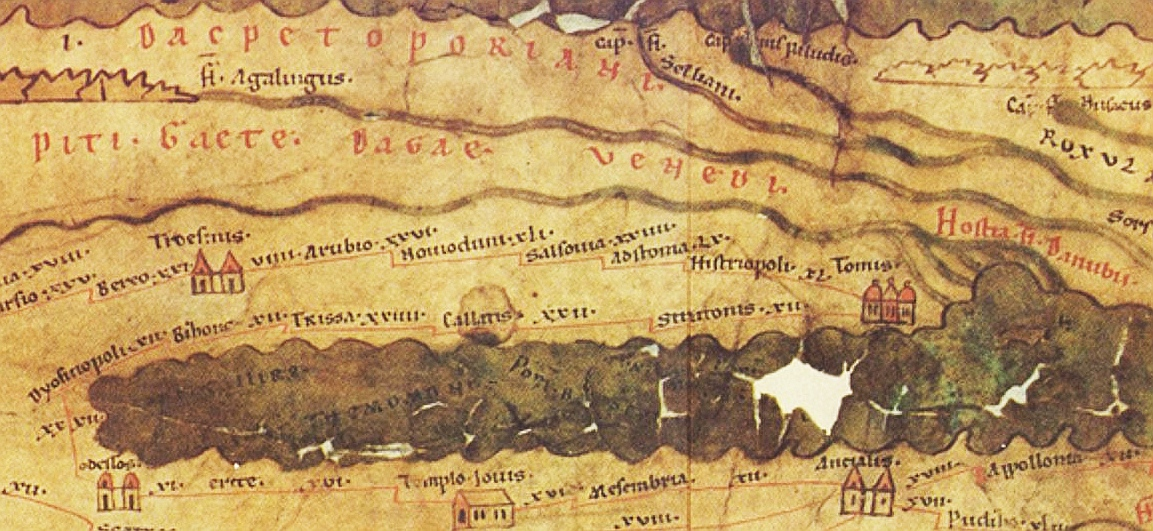
- In Tabula Peutingeriana

- Location within Romania
- 44.175480°N 28.656934°E
- Location: Constanța, Constanța, Romania

Site notes
- Elevation: 24 m (79 ft)
- Condition: Ruined

Tomis was a Roman fort in the ancient city of Tomis (Constanța) in the Roman province of Moesia. According to the Tabula Peutingeriana it is situated between Stratonis and Histriopolis.

== See also ==
- List of castra
