= Castra of Sânpaul (Mureș) =

Fort in the Roman province of Dacia

Castra of Sânpaul (Mureș county)
- Location within Romania
- 46°27′43.02″N 24°20′54.40″E
- Location: Sânpaul, Mureș, Romania

History
- Founded: 2nd century AD

Site notes
- Condition: Ruined

It was a fort in the Roman province of Dacia.

== See also ==
- List of castra
