= Poboru =

- Commune
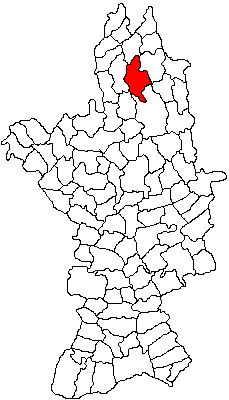
- Location in Olt County

- Location in Romania
- Coordinates: 44°40′N 24°30′E
- Country: Romania
- County: Olt
- Population (2021-12-01): 1,694
- Time zone: EET/EEST (UTC+2/+3)
- Vehicle reg.: OT

Poboru is a commune in Olt County, Muntenia, Romania. It is composed of six villages: Albești, Cornățelu, Creți, Poboru, Seaca and Surpeni.
