= Bata, Arad =

Bata
- Commune
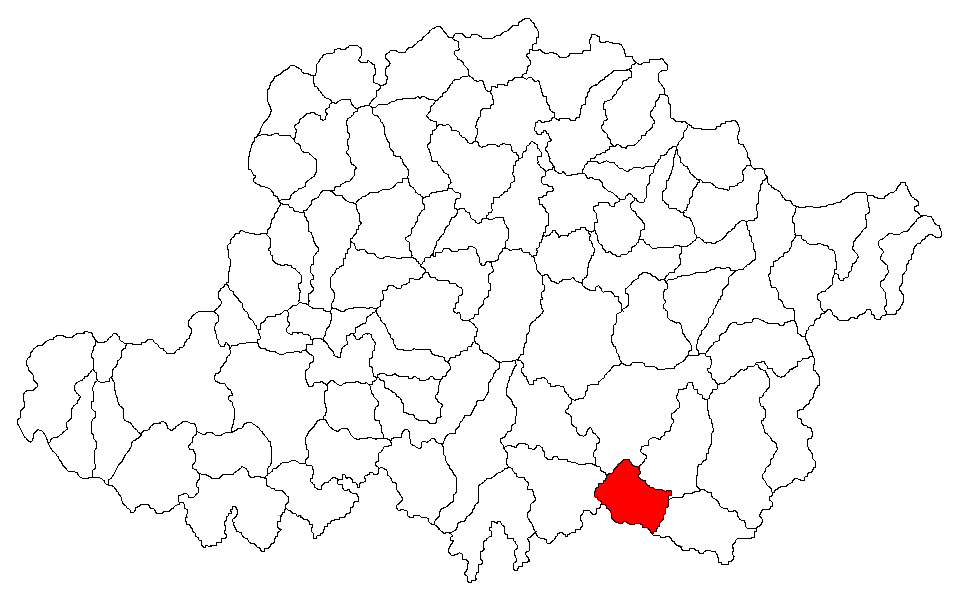
- Location in Arad County

- Location in Romania
- Coordinates: 46°1′N 22°2′E
- Country: Romania
- County: Arad
- Population (2021-12-01): 1,046
- Time zone: EET/EEST (UTC+2/+3)
- Vehicle reg.: AR

Bata (Hungarian: Batta) is a commune in Arad County, Romania, in the historical region of Banat. The commune lies in the contact zone of the Lipovei Plateau and the large deep valley of the Mureș River, respectively in the Brănișca-Păuliș Couloir. It is composed of four villages: Bacău de Mijloc (Bakamező), Bata (situated at 67 km from Arad), Bulci (Bulcs) and Țela (Cella).

== Population ==
According to the last census the population of the commune counts 1226 inhabitants. From an ethnical point of view it has the following structure: 99.6% are Romanians, 0.2% Hungarians and 0.2% are of other or undeclared nationalities.

== History ==
The first documentary record of the locality Bata dates back to 1367 as “Kethbata”. The old Turkish "bata" means "drinking place" and the Hungarian “keth” means "two". The first recorded name, therefore, meant "two drinking places".

Bacăul de Mijloc was first mentioned in 1717 as "Bacomesso". It was the Hungarian name of village which means "Baka's field", as until 1551 it was the possession of the Baki family. In Romanian, its name was originally "Bakanczea", and became Bacăul de Mijloc when it became part of Romania in 1919.

Bulci was first attested documentarily in 1225 as Bulch. The name derives from Hungarian and was a personal name in the early Middle Ages. In 1225, the village already had a Benedictine monastery. In 1233, King Andrew II of Hungary established its salt tax at 5,000 zuan.

Țela was first mentioned in 1427.

== Economy ==
The commune's present-day economy can be characterized as dynamic, with significant developments in all sectors of activity.

== Tourism ==
Bata commune can become an area with touristic attraction by trimming up its anthropic and natural potential. Among the commune's most important touristic sights we can mention the ruins of an abbey from the 18th century, the "Mocioni" castle from the 19th century with its surrounding park and the remains of a Roman and a feudal castle from Bulci.
