= Crâmpoia =

- Commune
- Seal

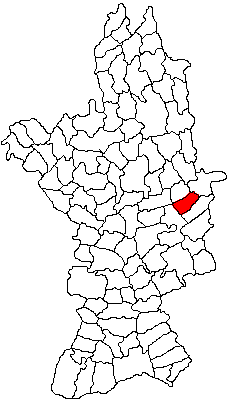
- Location in Olt County

- Location in Romania
- Coordinates: 44°18′N 24°45′E
- Country: Romania
- County: Olt
- Population (2021-12-01): 3,345
- Time zone: UTC+02:00 (EET)
  - Summer (DST): UTC+03:00 (EEST)
- Vehicle reg.: OT

Crâmpoia is a commune in Olt County, Muntenia, Romania. It is composed of two villages, Buta and Crâmpoia.

== Natives ==
- Nicușor Bancu
