= Pamfil Polonic =

- Born: 27 August 1858; Suceava, Bukovina (now in Romania)
- Died: 17 April 1945 (aged 86); Bucharest, Romania
- Citizenship: Romanian
- Scientific career
- Fields: History, Archaeology, Topography

Pamfil Polonic (27 August 1858 – 17 April 1945) was a Romanian archaeologist and topographer.
