= Cressa =

Cressa may refer to:

- Cressa (crustacean), a genus of crustaceans
- Cressa (plant), a genus of plants
- Cressa (Caria), a town of ancient Caria, now in Asian Turkey
- Cressa (Paphlagonia), a town of ancient Paphlagonia, now in Asian Turkey
- Cressa (Phocis), a town of ancient Phocis, Greece
- Cressa, Piedmont, a municipality in Piedmont, Italy
- Cressa (Thrace), a town of ancient Thrace, now in European Turkey
- Cressa, a dancer and percussionist with The Stone Roses
