= Long Wall (Thracian Chersonese) =

Ancient defensive structure

The Long Wall (Ancient Greek: Μακρὸν τεῖχος) or Wall of Agora (Ancient Greek: Ἀγοραῖον τεῖχος) after the nearby city, was a defensive wall at the base of the Thracian Chersonese (the modern peninsula of Gallipoli) in Antiquity.

== History ==
Map of the Thracian Chersonese in Antiquity

The Long Wall was actually a succession of walls on the base of the Thracian Chersonese, the first of which was built in the late 6th century BC by the Athenian magnate Miltiades the Elder. Miltiades became the ruler of the Greek city-states of the Thracian Chersonese in 555 BC. Threatened by the warlike Apsinthians, the historian Herodotus (The Histories, VI.36.2) reports that "his first act was to wall off the isthmus of the Chersonese from the city of Cardia across to Pactya, so that the Apsinthians would not be able to harm them by invading their land". Herodotus recorded the length of the isthmus as 36 stadia, or approximately 7.2 km. It is unknown how long the wall of Miltiades stood, but apparently it was left derelict soon after, for in the fifth century BC it had to be rebuilt by Pericles (Plutarch, Pericles, 19.1), and was again restored in the early fourth century by the Spartan commander Dercylidas (Xenophon, Hellenica, III.2.8–10; Diodorus Siculus, Bibliotheca, XIV.38.7), to protect the peninsula from raids by the Thracian tribes.

The wall continues to be mentioned by various Greek and Roman geographers throughout antiquity, but by the fourth century it was apparently in a dilapidated state; in 400, the Goths under Gainas were easily able to cross it. The wall suffered further damage in an earthquake in 447, and sometime during the reign of Zeno, probably in 480, another earthquake destroyed 40 of its towers. The wall likewise presented little obstacle to a Hunnic raid in 540. Following the devastation of the Chersonese, Emperor Justinian I ordered the comprehensive rebuilding of the wall. As described by the historian Procopius of Caesarea in his De Aedificiis, not only was the main wall strengthened and topped by breastworks and a covered portico, but it was also extended for some distance into the sea on both sides, and a permanent garrison was stationed there. These measures were effective in repelling a raid by the Kotrigurs in 559.

The wall is no longer mentioned thereafter, although it was included (often erroneously located) in maps of the 15th–19th centuries. It is possible that the later Byzantine toponym Koila teichos (Κοῖλα τεῖχος), mentioned also in the Partitio Romaniae of 1204 as Icalotichas, refers to the wall.

== Location and remains ==
The exact location of the wall is unknown. The most likely localization is on the isthmus 5 km east of Bulair at the base of the peninsula, which is also its narrowest part and corresponds to the length mentioned by Herodotus and Xenophon. It is however possible that the various walls were built in different locations through the centuries. Thus it has been suggested that the wall of Justinian lay further east, running from the shore of the Propontis near modern Kazan Ağacı north to Ortaköy and thence northwest to the mouths of the river Melas in the Gulf of Saros. The length of such a wall would make it very hard to defend, however.

One 19th-century source reports remnants of the fortifications at the entrance of the peninsula, but this is nowhere else corroborated. Likewise no archaeological digs have found any remains. Remnants of walls near Kazan Ağacı and Bolair cannot be definitely linked to the wall, although a trench near Germe Tepe has been proposed as having been part of this fortification line.

== Sources ==
- Külzer, Andreas (2008). Tabula Imperii Byzantini, Band 12: Ostthrakien (Eurōpē) (in German). Vienna: Verlag der Österreichischen Akademie der Wissenschaften. ISBN 978-3-7001-3945-4.
- Spring, Peter (2015). Great Walls and Linear Barriers. Pen and Sword. ISBN 978-1-47385-4-048.
