= Crithote (Thrace) =

Ancient Greek city located in Thrace

Coordinates: 40°24′24″N 26°39′06″E

Crithote or Krithote (Ancient Greek: Κριθωτή or Κριθώτη) was an ancient Greek city located in Thrace, located in the region of the Thracian Chersonesos. It was on the Hellespont north of Gallipoli, and was an Athenian colony founded by Miltiades. It is cited in the Periplus of Pseudo-Scylax among the cities of the Thracian Chersonesos: Aegospotami, Cressa, Crithote, and Pactya.

At the time of Strabo it was in ruins. The geographer places it between the cities of Callipolis and Pactya. Pliny the Elder, for his part, says it was adjacent to the Propontis, where were also the cities of Tiristasis and Cissa.

Isocrates highlights the excellent situation, from the strategic point of view, of the city, as a point of control of the Hellespont. Wherefore, the year 365 BCE, it was conquered, along with Sestos, by the Athenians under the command of Timotheus.

Bronze coins minted by Crithote are preserved, dated between 350 BCE and 281 BCE, with the inscriptions ΚΡΙ, ΚΡΙΘΟ o ΚΡΙΘΟΥΣΙΩΝ.

Its site is located 2 miles (3 km) east of Gelibolu, in Çanakkale Province, Turkey.

== See also ==
- Greek colonies in Thrace
