= Kressa =

Kressa (Ancient Greek: Κρῆσσα) may refer to:

- Kressa (Caria), a town of ancient Caria, now in Asian Turkey
- Kressa (Paphlagonia), a town of ancient Paphlagonia, now in Asian Turkey
- Kressa (Phocis), a town of ancient Phocis, Greece
- Kressa (Thrace), a town of ancient Thrace, now in European Turkey
