= Apsinthii =

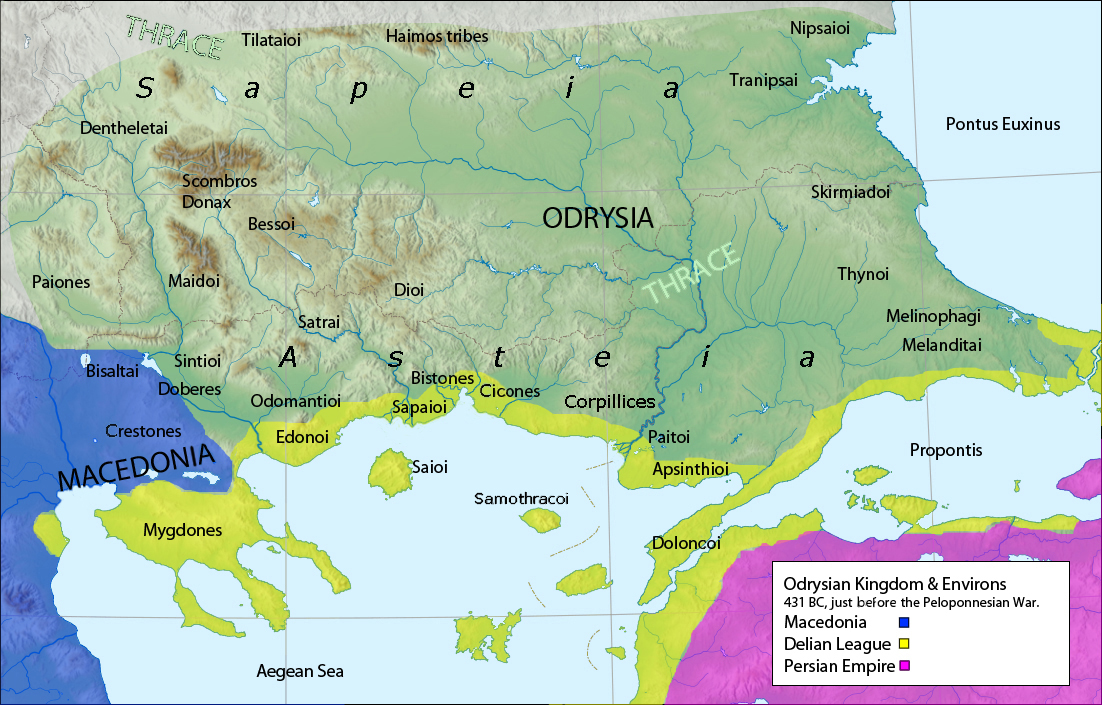
Approximate location of the Apsinthi

Apsinthii (Greek: Ἀψίνθιοι) is the name of a Thracian tribe mentioned by Herodotus. The Apsinthii were located east of the Dolonci, another Thracian tribe, and on Chersonesos. It was due to them that Miltiades erected a wall from Cardia to Pactye.

== See also ==
- Zerynthus
- List of Thracian tribes
