= Miltiades the Elder =

6th century BC Greek tyrant of the Chersonese

Tyrant of the Chersonese
- In office c. 556 BC – 525 BC
- Succeeded by: Stesagoras

Personal details
- Born: c. 590 BC Athens
- Died: c. 525 BC (aged c. 65)
- Relations: Miltiades the Younger (nephew)

Miltiades the Elder (ca. 590 – 525 BC) was an Athenian politician from the Philaid family. He is most famous for travelling to the Thracian Chersonese (now Gallipoli) where, at the behest of the local peoples, he ruled as a tyrant. During his reign, Miltiades' best-attested action was the construction of a defensive wall across the peninsula.

Miltiades was the uncle of Miltiades the Younger, who was a prominent commander in the Battle of Marathon.

== Early life and family ==
Miltiades the Elder was born in Athens in around 590 BC. His father was Cypselus the archon; Miltiades also claimed descent from the mythological king Aeacus. During this time, the Philaids were one of the wealthiest families in the city.

While living in Athens, Miltiades was a successful athlete. He owned a four-horse chariot, and won an Olympic victory in the chariot race in 560 BC.

== In the Thracian Chersonese ==
Map of the Thracian Chersonese in antiquity. The cities that Miltiades is credited with founding are visible in the northeast.

During this period, the Dolonci (a tribe from the Thracian Chersonese) suffered several military defeats against their rivals, the Apsinthians. They travelled to the Oracle of Delphi for advice, and were told to return to Thrace with a Greek colonist as their commander. The Dolonci asked Miltiades to take on this role, due to the hospitality he showed them on their return trip through Athens. Miltiades accepted this offer, although his motivations are ambiguous. The traditional view holds that Miltiades was dissatisfied with Peisistratus' rule and wanted to make his fortune elsewhere, but some scholars argue that Miltiades was actually participating in a Peisistratid foreign policy that sought to exert its influence in the region.

Miltiades arrived in the Thracian Chersonese with a group of Athenian settlers, probably between 556 BC and 550 BC, and these followers populated and fortified the city of Cardia. Miltiades was also credited with the founding of several other Thracian cities, including Pactye, Agora, and Crithote. Miltiades' most famous construction was the Long Wall stretching from Cardia to Pactye. This wall was completed relatively early in Miltiades' reign, most likely prior to 546 BC, and was designed to keep the Apsinthians out of the peninsula.

During his reign, Miltiades also went to war against the city of Lampsacus. This war was largely unsuccessful, and Miltiades was briefly taken captive in a Lampsacene ambush. However, Croesus of Lydia interceded on behalf of Miltiades, compelling the Lampsacenes to release him unharmed.

Miltiades died, childless, around 525 BC. He was succeeded as tyrant by his nephew, Stesagoras, who was killed shortly afterwards by the Lampsacenes. In the Thracian Chersonese, an annual contest in horse-racing and gymnastics was then inaugurated in Miltiades' memory; after Stesagoras' murder, Lampsacenes were barred from these games.

== The three-Miltiades theory ==
N. G. L. Hammond has argued that the figure of Miltiades the Elder is actually a conflation of two statesmen of the same name: Miltiades I, who led the first Athenian settlers to the Thracian Chersonese, and Miltiades II, who founded the city of Chersonesus (also called Agora) there. In Hammond's reckoning, Miltiades II was the son of Miltiades I, born around 560 BC; it was after Miltiades II that Stesagoras came to power. He also holds Miltiades II to be the ruler in whose honour the games were held.

== Sources ==
- Borza, Eugene N. "Cardia." In Oxford Classical Dictionary, 4th edition, edited by Simon Hornblower, Antony Spawforth, and Esther Eidinow. Oxford: Oxford University Press, 2012. Link.
- Casson, Stanley. Macedonia, Thrace and Illyria: their relations to Greece from the earliest times down to the time of Philip, son of Amyntas. Westport, CT: Greenwood Press, 1971.
- Hammond, N. G. L. "The Philiads and the Chersonese." In The Classical Quarterly 6, no. 3/4 (Jul. – Oct. 1956), 113–129.
- Herodotus. Histories. Translated by A. D. Godley. Cambridge: Harvard University Press, 1920. Link.
- Mitchell, John Malcolm (1911). "Miltiades" . Encyclopædia Britannica. Vol. 18 (11th ed.). pp. 479–480.
- Valeva, Julia, Emil Nankov, and Denver Graninger, eds. A Companion to Ancient Thrace. Chichester, West Sussex: Wiley Blackwell, 2015.
