= Diopeithes =

4th-century BC Athenian military leader

Diopeithes (Greek: Διοπείθης; lived during the 4th century BC) was an Athenian general, probably the father of the poet Menander, who was sent out to the Thracian Chersonese about 343 BC, at the head of a body of Athenian settlers or cleruchs.

Disputes having arisen about their boundaries between these settlers and the Cardians, the latter were supported, but not with arms in the first instance, by king Philip II of Macedon (359–336 BC), who, when the Athenians remonstrated, proposed that their quarrel with Cardia should be referred to arbitration. This proposal being indignantly rejected, Philip sent troops to the assistance of the Cardians, and Diopeithes retaliated by ravaging the maritime district of Thrace, which was subject to the Macedonians, while Philip was absent in the interior of the same country on his expedition against Teres and Cersobleptes. Philip sent a letter of remonstrance to Athens, and Diopeithes was arraigned by the Macedonian party, not only for his aggression on the king's territory, but also for the means to which he resorted for the support of his mercenaries. He was defended by Demosthenes in the oration, still extant, On the Chersonese, 341 BC, and the defence was successful, for he was permitted to retain his command. After this, and probably during the war of Philip with Byzantium (340 BC), Diopeithes again invaded the Macedonian territory in Thrace, took the towns of Crobyle and Tiristasis and enslaved the inhabitants, and when an ambassador, named Amphilochus, came to negotiate for the release of the prisoners, he seized his person in defiance of all international law, and compelled him to pay nine talents for his ransom. The enmity of Diopeithes to Philip appears to have recommended him to the favour of the king of Persia Artaxerxes III, who, as we learn from Aristotle, sent him some valuable presents, which arrived just prior to his death.
