= Cobrys =

Coastal Greek town in ancient Thrace

Coordinates: 40°35′22″N 26°50′56″E

Cobrys or Kobrys (Ancient Greek: Κῶβρυς) was a coastal Greek town in ancient Thrace, on the Thracian Chersonesus. It is mentioned in the Periplus of Pseudo-Scylax

It was an Emporium of the Cardia.

There have been unconvincing attempts to identify Cobrys with Crobyle. Cobrys' site is located 1 mile (1.6 km) south of Kavak Suyu, in European Turkey.

== See also ==
- Greek colonies in Thrace
