= Agora (Thrace) =

Ancient town in Thrace

Coordinates: 40°30′49″N 26°47′11″E

Agora (Ancient Greek: Ἀγορά), also called Cherronesos or Chersonesos (Ancient Greek: Χερρόνησος, Χερσόνησος; IPA^{(key)}: /kʰer.ró.nɛː.sos/, /kʰer.só.nɛː.sos/), was an ancient Greek town in Thrace. It was situated about the middle of the narrow neck of the Thracian Chersonese (called today Gallipoli peninsula), and not far from Cardia, in what is now European Turkey.

It was a colony of Athens, founded between 561 and 556 BCE, and a member of the Delian League. It is known for its series of tyrants in antiquity. Xerxes, when invading Greece in 480 BCE, passed through it.

Its site is tentatively located near modern Bolayır, Turkey.

== Tyrants ==
According to the Greek Historian Herodotus, Militiades the Elder was chosen by the Dolonci to be tyrant of Chersonesos. His most notable achievement was building a long wall to guard from invaders crossing the isthmus. Following the death of Militiades the Elder, his maternal half brother, Stesagoras acquired power.

Stesagoras only ruled for approximately three years (519 - 516 BCE), when he was struck in the head by an axe. After Stesagoras' death, the Peisistratids of Athens sent Militiades the Younger, Stesagoras' brother, to mourn and honor him. After grieving for a period of time, Militiades the Younger restrained all the powerful men of the city and seized control of the area. He later abandoned the area when Darius I invaded in 493 BCE.

== See also ==
- Greek colonies in Thrace
- Militiades the Elder
- Militiades the Younger
- Darius I

== Sources ==
- Smith, William (editor); Dictionary of Greek and Roman Geography, "Agora", London, (1854)
