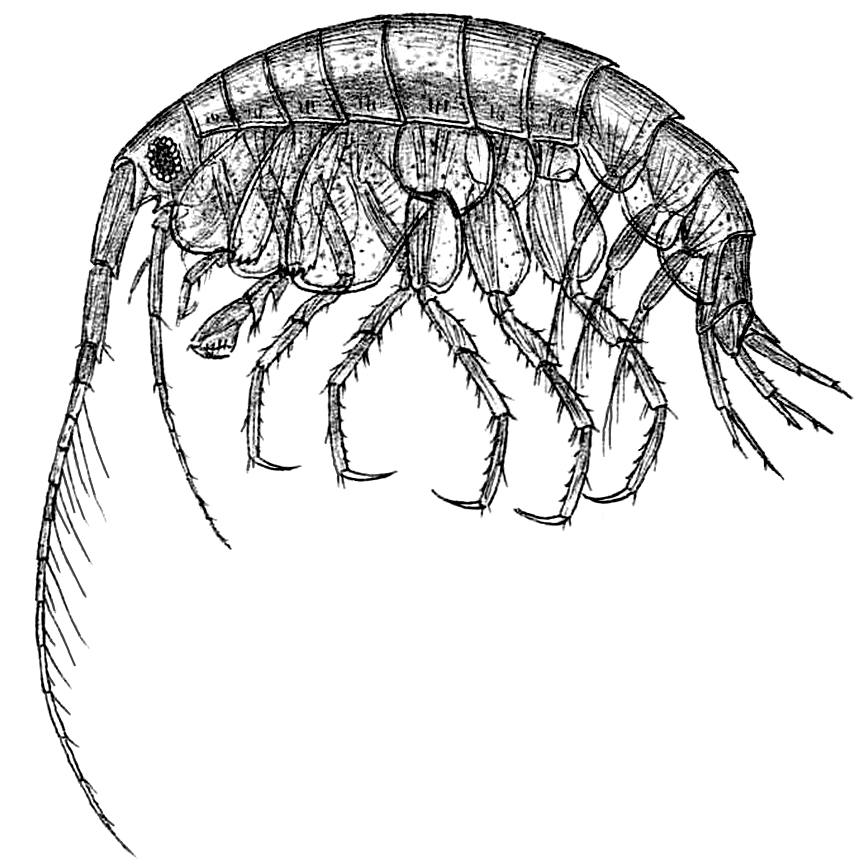
- Cressa dubia

Scientific classification
- Kingdom: Animalia
- Phylum: Arthropoda
- Class: Malacostraca
- Order: Amphipoda
- Family: Cressidae
- Genus: Cressa
- Species: C. dubia

Binomial name
- Cressa dubia (Spence Bate, 1857)

Synonyms
- Cressa schiodtei Boeck, 1871; Danaia dubia Spence Bate, 1857

= Cressa dubia =

Species of crustacean

Cressa dubia is a species of amphipod within the family Cressidae. The species is found distributed in the northern Atlantic in areas such as the Tyrrhenian Sea, the North Sea, and the Irish Sea in benthic environments at depths of 31 to 330 meters. Sizes range from 3 to 6 millimeters in length.
