= Crobyle =

Crobyle or Krobyle (Ancient Greek: Κρωβύλη) was a Greek town in ancient Thrace, probably located in the region of the Propontis. In 340 BCE, Crobyle was taken by the Athenian general Diopeithes, who enslaved its inhabitants along with those of Tiristasis.

Despite unconvincing attempts to identify Crobyle with Cobrys, its site has not been located.
