= Zerynthus =

Zerynthus (Ancient Greek: Ζήρυνθος, romanized: Zḗrunthos; Latin: Zerynthus) was a town of the Apsynthii in Thrace which had a temple of Apollo and Aphrodite. Because of that two deities derived the epithets of Zerynthius (male) and Zerynthia (female) respectively.

According to Lycophron's Alexandra, this was the location of Zerynthos or Zirynthia, a cave sacred to Hecate.
