= Cypasis =

Emporium of the Cardia

Coordinates: 40°37′30″N 26°50′28″E

Cypasis or Kypasis (Ancient Greek: Κύπασις) was an Emporium of the Cardia, on the east of the Hebrus River, on the Bay of Melas.

Its site is located 2 miles (3.2 km) north of the mouth of the Kavak River in European Turkey.
