= Pactya =

City located in ancient Thrace

Coordinates: 40°29′07″N 26°46′50″E

Pactya or Paktye (Ancient Greek: Πακτύη) was an ancient Greek city located in ancient Thrace, on the Thracian Chersonesus. It is cited in the Periplus of Pseudo-Scylax, in its recitation of the towns of the Thracian Chersonesus, along with Aegospotami, Cressa, Crithote and then Pactya, situated 36 stadia from Cardia. It is said that Miltiades founded it. Strabo places it on the Propontis between Crithote and Macron Teichos. According to Herodotus, Miltiades the Elder ordered a wall built between Cardia, which was on the coast of Gulf of Melas and Pactya, which was on the Propontis side, to prevent invasion of the Chersonesus by the Apsinthii. Alcibiades retired here the Athenians had for the second time deprived him of the command. It was a member of the Delian League. Pliny the Elder points out that both Cardia and Pactya later joined to form Lysimachia.

Its site is located 2 miles (3.2 km) south of Bolayır, Turkey.

== See also ==
- List of ancient Greek cities
- Greek colonies in Thrace
