= Tyrodiza =

Greek city in ancient Thrace

Coordinates: 40°37′04″N 27°06′51″E

Tyrodiza (Ancient Greek: Τυρόδιζα) was a Greek city in ancient Thrace, located in the region of the Propontis. Hellanicus of Lesbos calls it Tyroriza (Τυρόριζα).

It appears to have flourished between 550 BCE and 330 BCE, and is identified with the place called Tiristasis (Τειρίστασις and Τιρίστασις) in the Periplus of Pseudo-Scylax and Pliny the Elder. It was a member of the Delian League and appears in the tribute lists of ancient Athens between 452/1 and 445/4 BCE. In 340 BCE, Tiristasis was taken by the Athenian general Diopeithes, who enslaved its inhabitants along with those of Crobyle.

Its location is near the modern Turkish town of Şarköy, in Tekirdağ Province.

== See also ==
- Greek colonies in Thrace
