= Delphinion =

Ancient temples of Apollo Delphinius

Coordinates: 37°31′47.7″N 27°16′50.5″E

A Delphinion (ancient Greek: Δελφίνιον) found in ancient Greece, was a temple of Apollo Delphinios ("Apollo of Delphi") also known as "Delphic Apollo" or "Pythian Apollo", the principal god of Delphi, who was regarded as the protector of ports and ships.

== The Delphinion at Miletus ==
The ruin of the Delphinion in Miletus is still mostly standing. A rectangular temenos, the remains of the temple at the site date back to as early as the fifth century B.C.E. Still present are a rectangular altar with volute acroteria, as well as a few other round marble altars. An "annual Spring procession which went from Miletus to the Temple of Apollo at Didyma began at the Delphinion". Inscriptions found on the walls of the Delphinion tell us the site also served as the city archive.

== The Delphinion at Athens ==
The Delphinion in Athens near the Acropolis contained a court of law, which was used to try homicide cases where the accused had claimed the defence of justifiable homicide.
