= Cressidae =

Scientific classification
- Kingdom: Animalia
- Phylum: Arthropoda
- Class: Malacostraca
- Order: Amphipoda
- Superfamily: Amphilochoidea
- Family: Cressidae; Stebbing, 1899

Family of crustaceans

Cressidae refers to a family of tiny marine crustaceans called amphipods, known for their small size (millimeters long) and benthic (seafloor) dwelling. The family contains two genera:

- Cressa Boeck, 1857
- Cressina Stephensen, 1931
