= Cressa (Thrace) =

Ancient Greek city located in ancient Thrace

Coordinates: 40°21′04″N 26°37′33″E

Cressa or Kressa (Ancient Greek: Κρῆσσα) was an ancient Greek city located in ancient Thrace, on the Thracian Chersonesus. It is cited in the Periplus of Pseudo-Scylax, in the second position of its recitation of the towns of the Thracian Chersonesus, along with Aegospotami, Cressa, Crithote and Pactya. It may be the same town cited by Pliny the Elder as Crissa on the Propontis.

Its site is located 1.5 miles (2.4 km) northeast of Aigospotamoi, Turkey.

== See also ==
- Greek colonies in Thrace
