= Cressa (crustacean) =

Scientific classification
- Domain: Eukaryota
- Kingdom: Animalia
- Phylum: Arthropoda
- Class: Malacostraca
- Order: Amphipoda
- Family: Cressidae
- Genus: Cressa; Boeck, 1857

Genus of amphipod crustaceans

Cressa is a genus of amphipod crustaceans in the family Creesidae, with species living in depths from 31 to 820 meters.

== Species ==
These species were placed by the World Register of Marine Species.

- Cressa abyssicola G. O. Sars, 1879
- Cressa bereskini Gurjanova, 1936
- Cressa carinata Stephensen, 1931
- Cressa cristata Myers, 1969
- Cressa dubia Spence Bate, 1857
- Cressa jeanjusti Krapp-Schickel, 2005
- Cressa mediterranea Ruffo, 1979
- Cressa minuta Boeck, 1871
- Cressa quinquedentata Stephensen, 1931
