= Cressa (Paphlagonia) =

Cressa or Kressa (Ancient Greek: Κρῆσσα) was a city of ancient Paphlagonia. According to Greek mythology, it was founded by Meriones after the Trojan War. It was taken by Ziaelas of Bithynia.

Its site is unlocated.
