= Dolonci =

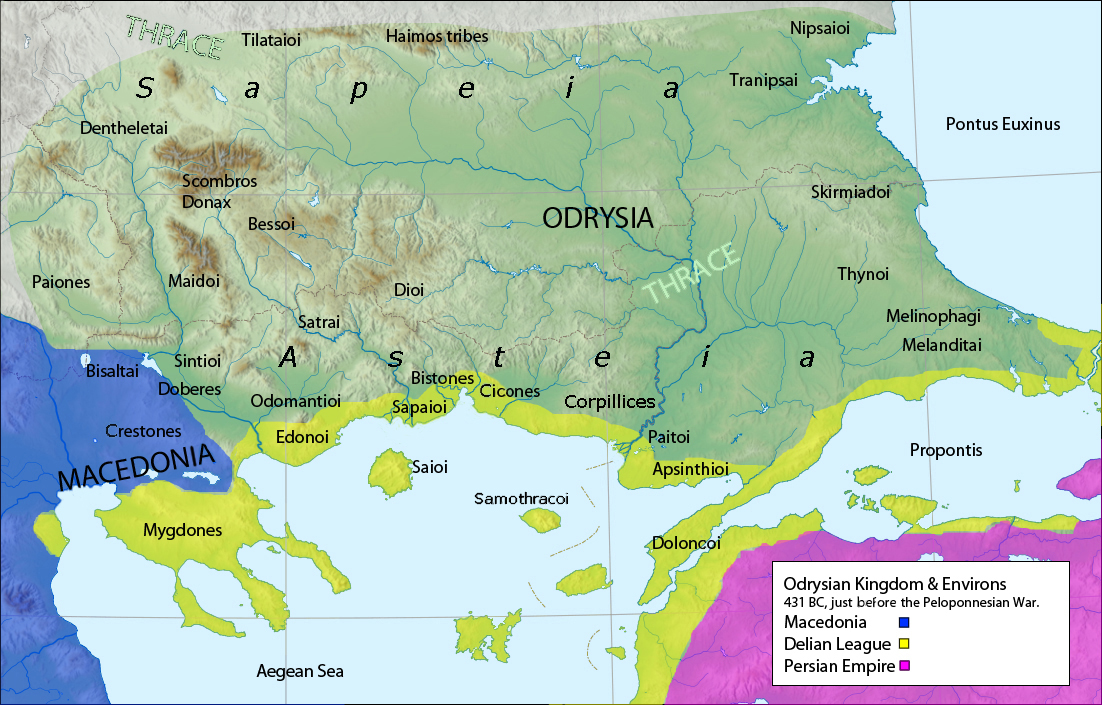
Approximate location of the Dolonki

Dolonci or Dolonki (Greek: Δόλογκοι) is the name of a Thracian tribe in Thracian Chersonese. They are mentioned by Herodotus.

== See also ==
- List of Thracian tribes
