= Cressa (Caria) =

Town of ancient Caria

Cressa or Kressa (Ancient Greek: Κρῆσσα) was a town on the coast of ancient Caria, which Pliny the Elder calls Cressa Portus, and places 20 M.P. from Rhodus. It is also mentioned by Ptolemy. Writing in the 19th century, William Martin Leake stated "that the excellent harbour of Cressa is now called Aplothíka by the Greeks, and Porto Cavaliere by the Italians; and on its western shore are the ruins of a Hellenic fortress and town, which are undoubtedly those of Loryma."
