= Cardia (Thrace) =

Ancient city in Thrace

Coordinates: 40°32′50″N 26°44′27″E

Cardia or Kardia (Ancient Greek: Kαρδία), anciently the chief town of the Thracian Chersonese (today Gallipoli peninsula), was situated at the head of the Gulf of Melas (today the Gulf of Saros). It was originally a colony of the Milesians and Clazomenians; but subsequently, in the time of Miltiades (late 6th century BC), the place also received Athenian colonists, as proved by Miltiades tyranny (515–493 BC). But this didn't make Cardia necessarily always pro-Athenian.

== Name ==
According to local tradition, the name Kardia was derived from the Greek word kardía (“heart”). It was said that when the city's founder, Hermochares (Ἑρμοχάρης), was performing a sacrifice, a raven seized the heart of the sacrificial animal and carried it away, eventually dropping it at the site where the city was founded. Another tradition suggests that the name may have originated from a pre-existing name for the area in the language of the Scythians. Another explanation is given by Gaius Julius Solinus, who states that Kardia was so called because the city was built in the shape of a heart, while Pliny the Elder similarly explains that the name came from the heart-like shape of the land.

== History ==
In 410 BC, during the Peloponnesian War, the Athenians withdrew from Sestus to Cardia at night after learning that the Spartan admiral Mindarus was preparing to attack them with many ships. There, Alcibiades rejoined the fleet after escaping imprisonment in Persia, and the Athenians regrouped before launching the campaign that culminated in their decisive victory at the Battle of Cyzicus.

In 357 BC, when Athens took control of the Chersonese, Cardia under the rule of a Thracian prince, was the only city to remain neutral; but the decisive year was 352 BC, when the city concluded a treaty of amity with king Philip II of Macedonia. A great crisis exploded when Diopeithes, an Athenian mercenary captain, had in 343 BC brought Attic settlers to the town; and since Cardia was unwilling to receive them, Philip immediately sent help to the town. The king proposed to settle the dispute between the two cities by arbitration, but Athens refused. Demosthenes, the famous Greek patriot and orator, spoke on this very matter to the Athenian Senate in 341 BC his "Oration on the State of the Chersonesus":

Our present concernment is about the affairs of the Chersonesus, and Philip's expedition into Thrace...but most of our orators insist upon the actions and designs of Diopithes...which, if one moment neglected, the loss may be irreparable; here our attention is instantly demanded...shall Philip be left at full liberty to pursue all his other designs, provided he keeps from Attica; and shall not Diopithes be permitted to assist the Thracians? And if he does, shall we accuse him of involving us in a war?...none of you can be weak enough to imagine that Philip's desires are centered in those paltry villages of Thrace...and has no designs on the ports...arsenals...navies...silver mines, and all the other revenues of Athens; but that he will leave them for you to enjoy...? Impossible! No; these and all his expeditions are really intended to facilitate the conquest of Athens....let us shake off our extravagant and dangerous supineness; let us supply the necessary expenses; let us call on our allies...so that, as he hath his force constantly prepared to injure and enslave the Greeks, yours too may be ever ready to protect and assist them.

The town was destroyed by Lysimachus about 309 BC, and although it was afterwards rebuilt, it never again rose to any degree of prosperity, as Lysimachia, which was built in its vicinity and peopled with the inhabitants of Cardia, became the chief town in that neighbourhood.

Cardia was the birthplace of several prominent individuals, including Alexander's secretary Eumenes of Cardia and the historian Hieronymus of Cardia. Another Cardian, Xenodochus of Cardia, served in Alexander's army and is known from Plutarch's account of the incident in which Alexander killed Cleitus the Black.

In his Stratagems, Polyaenus mentions a surprise attack against the city of Kardia by an Aristomachus. The event unfolded as follows: after capturing several Cardian triremes, Aristomachus placed his own soldiers at the oars and disguised the ships with Cardian colours and standards. He then towed the captured vessels into the harbour as if they were a victorious Cardian fleet returning from battle. As evening fell, Aristomachus entered the harbour with music playing, creating the appearance of a celebration. The people of Kardia, believing that their fleet had achieved a great victory, rushed out of the city to welcome the returning ships. When Aristomachus troops landed, they attacked the unprepared crowd and carried out a massacre.

Plutarch in the "Life of Eumenes" writes that the young men and boys of Cardia were exercising in the Pankration and wrestling.

Cobrys and Cypasis were emporia of Cardia.
