= Gallipoli =

Peninsula in northwestern Turkey

Coordinates: 40°21′N 26°27′E

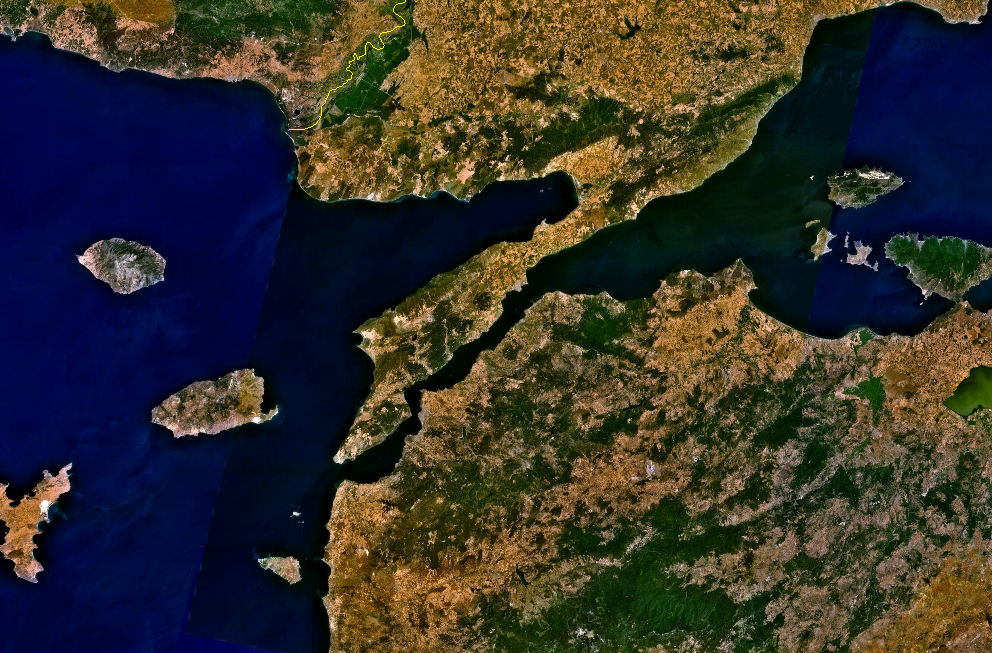
Satellite image of the Gallipoli peninsula and surrounding area

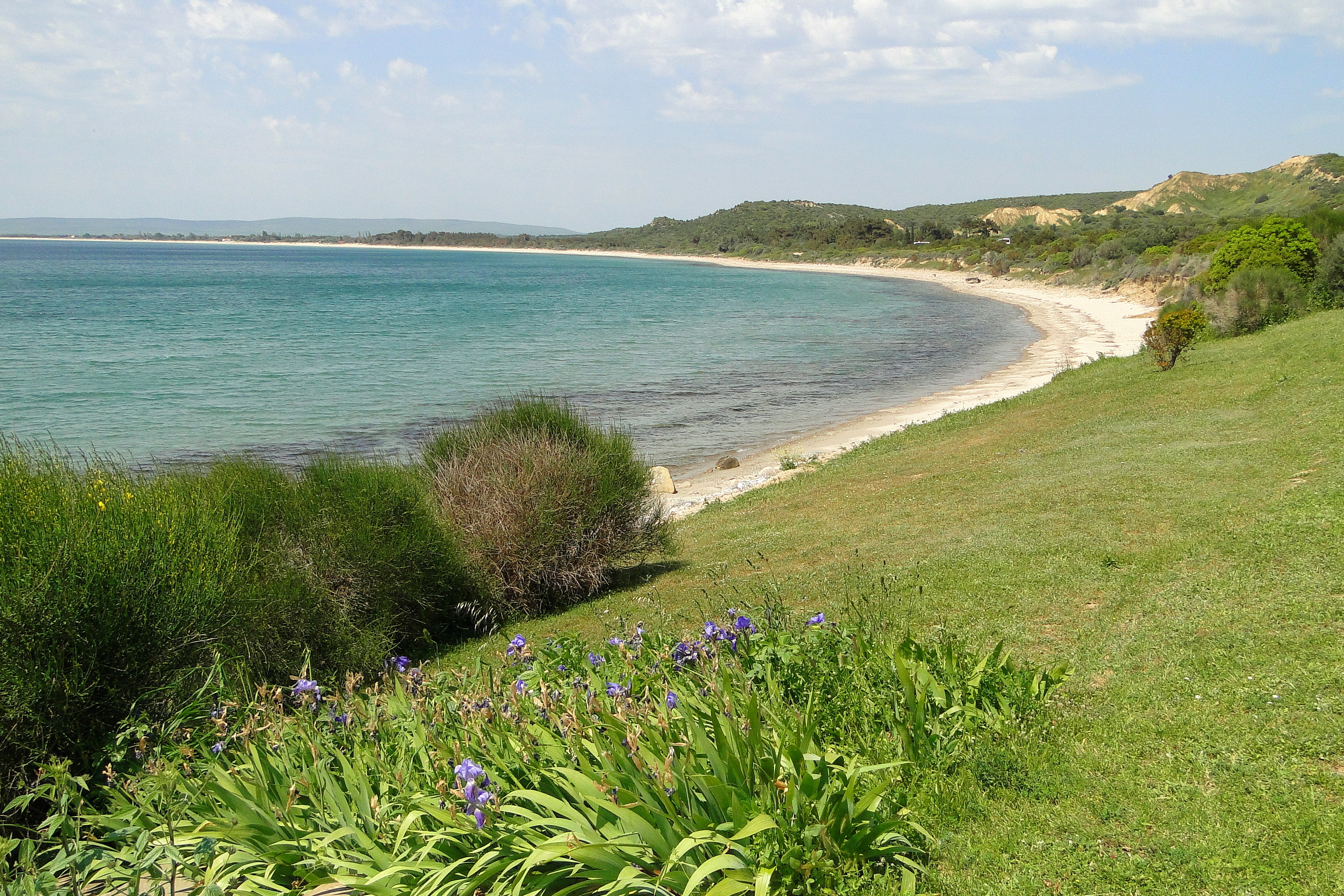
ANZAC Cove in Gallipoli

The Gallipoli Peninsula (/ɡəˈlɪpəli, ɡæ-/) (Note: Jones, Daniel (2003) [1917], Peter Roach; James Hartmann; Jane Setter (eds.), English Pronouncing Dictionary, Cambridge: Cambridge University Press, ISBN 3-12-539683-2. Turkish: Gelibolu Yarımadası; Greek: Χερσόνησος της Καλλίπολης, romanized: Chersónisos tis Kallípolis)) is located in the southern part of East Thrace, the European part of Turkey, with the Aegean Sea to the west and the Dardanelles strait to the east.

Gallipoli is the Italian form of the Greek name Καλλίπολις (Kallípolis), meaning 'beautiful city', the original name of the modern town of Gelibolu. In antiquity, the peninsula was known as the Thracian Chersonese (Ancient Greek: Θρακικὴ Χερσόνησος, romanized: Thrakiké Chersónesos; Latin: Chersonesus Thracica).

The peninsula runs in a south-westerly direction into the Aegean Sea, between the Dardanelles (formerly known as the Hellespont), and the Gulf of Saros (formerly the bay of Melas). In antiquity, it was protected by the Long Wall, a defensive structure built across the narrowest part of the peninsula near the ancient city of Agora. The isthmus traversed by the wall was only 36 stadia in breadth or about 6.5 km (4.0 mi), but the length of the peninsula from this wall to its southern extremity, Cape Mastusia, was 420 stadia or about 77.5 km (48.2 mi).

== History ==
=== Antiquity and Middle Ages ===
Map of the Thracian Chersonese

In ancient times, the Gallipoli Peninsula was known as the Thracian Chersonese (from Greek χερσόνησος, 'peninsula') to the Greeks and later the Romans. It was the location of several prominent towns, including Cardia, Pactya, Callipolis (Gallipoli), Alopeconnesus (Ἀλωπεκόννησος), Sestos, Madytos, and Elaeus. The peninsula was renowned for its wheat. It also benefited from its strategic importance on the main route between Europe and Asia, as well as from its control of the shipping route from Crimea. The city of Sestos was the main crossing-point on the Hellespont.

According to Herodotus, the Thracian tribe of Dolonci (Δόλογκοι) (or 'barbarians' according to Cornelius Nepos) held possession of the peninsula before Greek colonizers arrived. Then, settlers from Ancient Greece, mainly of Ionian and Aeolian stock, founded about 12 cities on the peninsula in the 7th century BC. The Athenian statesman Miltiades the Elder founded a major Athenian colony there around 560 BC. He took authority over the entire peninsula, augmenting its defences against incursions from the mainland. It eventually passed to his nephew, the more famous Miltiades the Younger, about 524 BC. The peninsula was abandoned to the Persians in 493 BC after the beginning of the Greco-Persian Wars (499–478 BC).

The Persians were eventually expelled, after which the peninsula was for a time ruled by Athens, which enrolled it into the Delian League in 478 BC. The Athenians established a number of cleruchies on the Thracian Chersonese and sent an additional 1,000 settlers around 448 BC. Sparta gained control after the decisive Battle of Aegospotami in 404 BC, but the peninsula subsequently reverted to the Athenians. During the 4th century BC, the Thracian Chersonese became the focus of a bitter territorial dispute between Athens and Macedon, whose king Philip II sought its possession. It was eventually ceded to Philip in 338 BC.

After the death of Philip's son Alexander the Great in 323 BC, the Thracian Chersonese became the object of contention among Alexander's successors. Lysimachus established his capital Lysimachia here. In 278 BC, Celtic tribes from Galatia in Asia Minor settled in the area. In 196 BC, the Seleucid king Antiochus III seized the peninsula. This alarmed the Greeks and prompted them to seek the aid of the Romans, who conquered the Thracian Chersonese, which they gave to their ally Eumenes II of Pergamon in 188 BC. At the extinction of the Attalid dynasty in 133 BC it passed again to the Romans, who from 129 BC administered it in the Roman province of Asia. It was subsequently made a state-owned territory (ager publicus) and during the reign of the emperor Augustus it was imperial property.

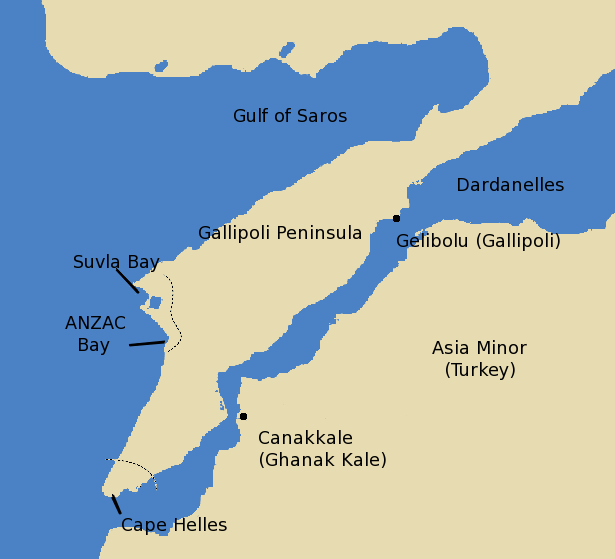
Map of the peninsula and its surroundings

The Thracian Chersonese was part of the Eastern Roman Empire from its foundation in 395 AD. In 443 AD, Attila the Hun invaded the Gallipoli Peninsula during one of the last stages of his grand campaign that year. He captured both Callipolis and Sestus. Aside from a brief period from 1204 to 1235, when it was controlled by the Republic of Venice, the Byzantine Empire ruled the territory until 1356. During the night between 1 and 2 March 1354, a strong earthquake destroyed the city of Gallipoli and its city walls, weakening its defenses.

=== Ottoman era ===
==== Ottoman conquest ====
Within a month after the devastating 1354 earthquake the Ottomans besieged and captured the town of Gallipoli, making it the first Ottoman stronghold in Europe and the staging area for Ottoman expansion across the Balkans. The Savoyard Crusade recaptured Gallipoli for Byzantium in 1366, but the beleaguered Byzantines were forced to hand it back in September 1376. The Greeks living there were allowed to continue their everyday activities. In the 19th century, Gallipoli (Ottoman Turkish: گلیبولو, Gelibolu) was a district (kaymakamlik) in the Vilayet of Adrianople, with about thirty thousand inhabitants: comprising Greeks, Turks, Armenians and Jews.

==== Crimean War (1853–1856) ====
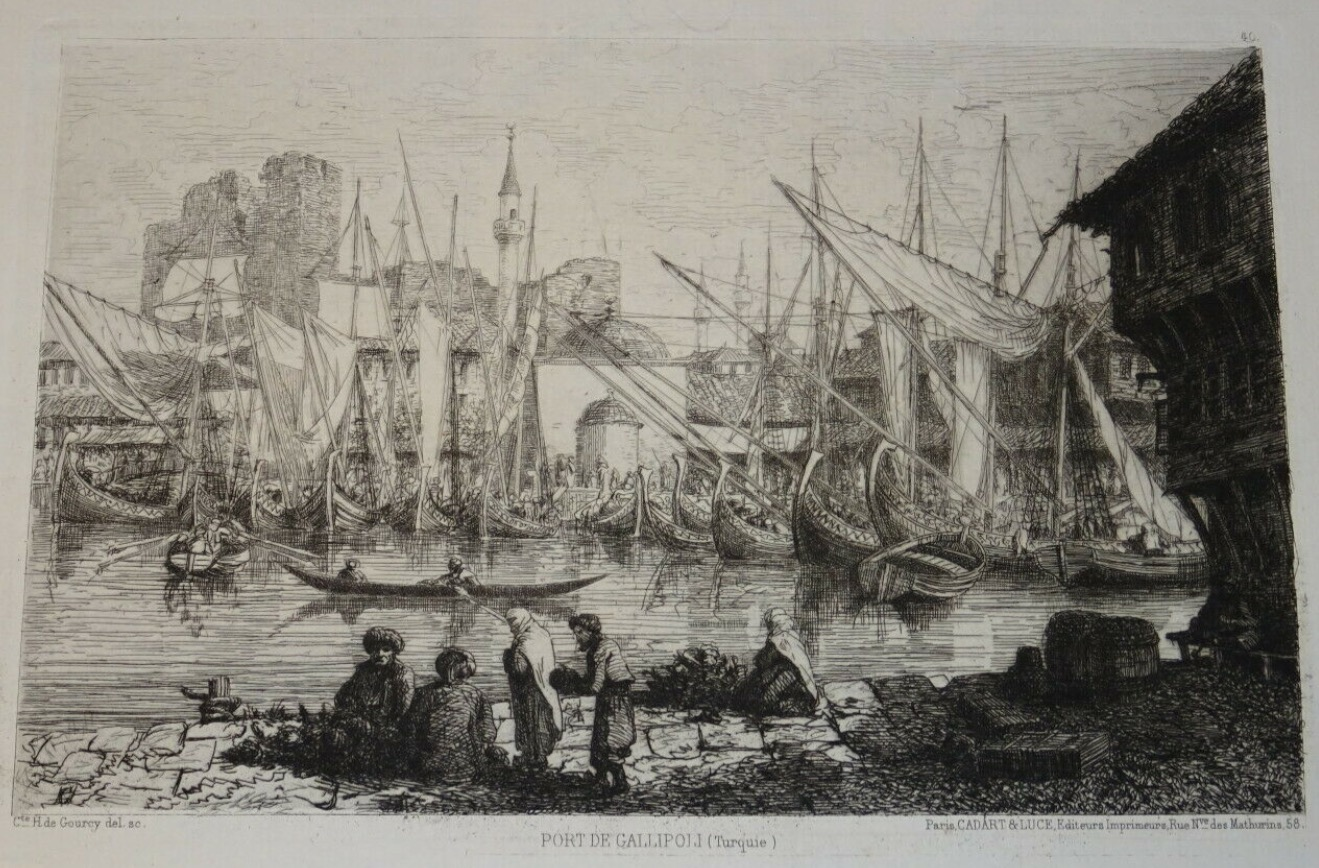
The port of Gallipoli, c. 1880

Gallipoli became a major encampment for British and French forces in 1854 during the Crimean War, and the harbour was also a stopping-off point between the western Mediterranean and Constantinople.

In March 1854 British and French engineers constructed an 11.5 km (7.1 mi) line of defence to protect the peninsula from a possible Russian attack and secure control of the route to the Mediterranean Sea.

==== First Balkan War (1912–1913) ====
During the First Balkan War, the 1913 Battle of Bulair and several minor skirmishes took place where the Ottoman army fought in the Greek villages near Gallipoli". The Report of the International Commission on the Balkan Wars mention destruction and massacres in the area by the Ottoman army against Greek and Bulgarian population.

The Ottoman Government, under the pretext that a village was within the firing line, ordered its evacuation within three hours. The residents abandoned everything they possessed, left their village and went to Gallipoli. Seven of the Greek villagers who stayed two minutes later than the three-hour limit allowed for the evacuation were shot by the soldiers. After the end of the Balkan War the exiles were allowed to return. But as the Government allowed only the Turks to rebuild their houses and furnish them, the exiled Greeks were compelled to remain in Gallipoli.

==== World War I: Gallipoli campaign (1914–1918) ====
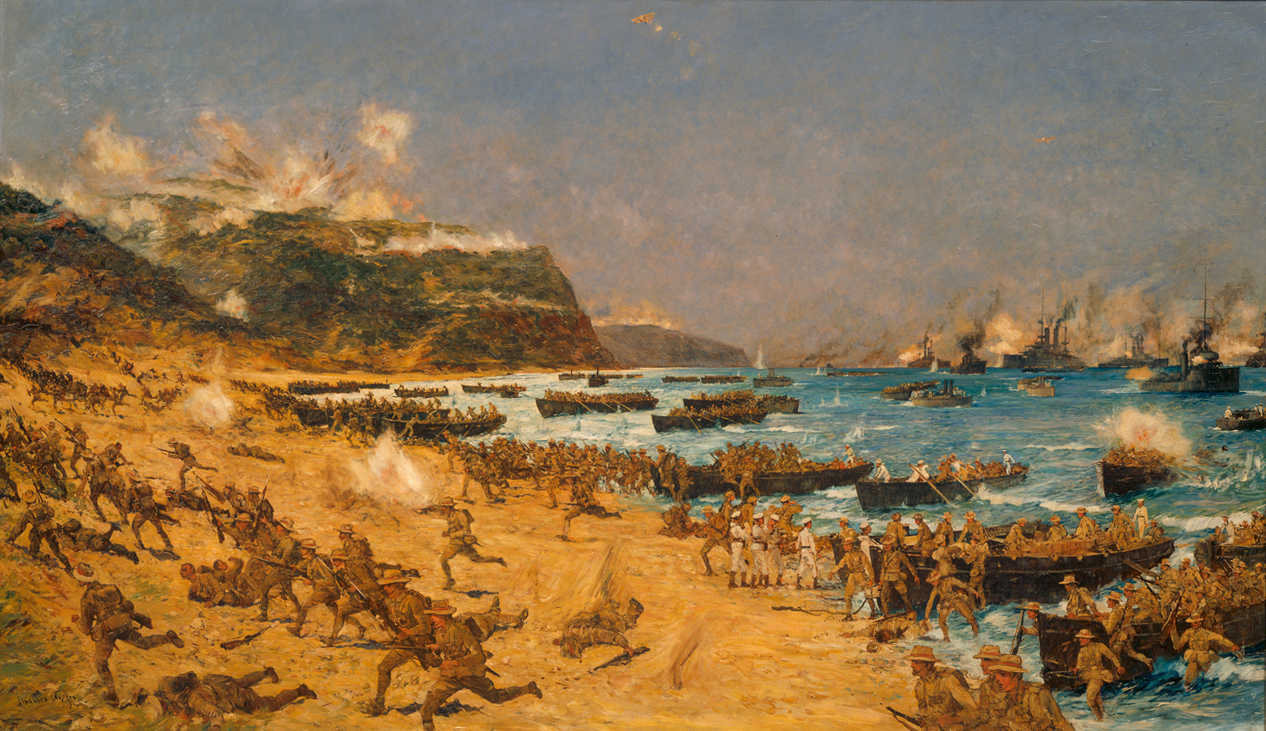
Landing at Gallipoli in April 1915

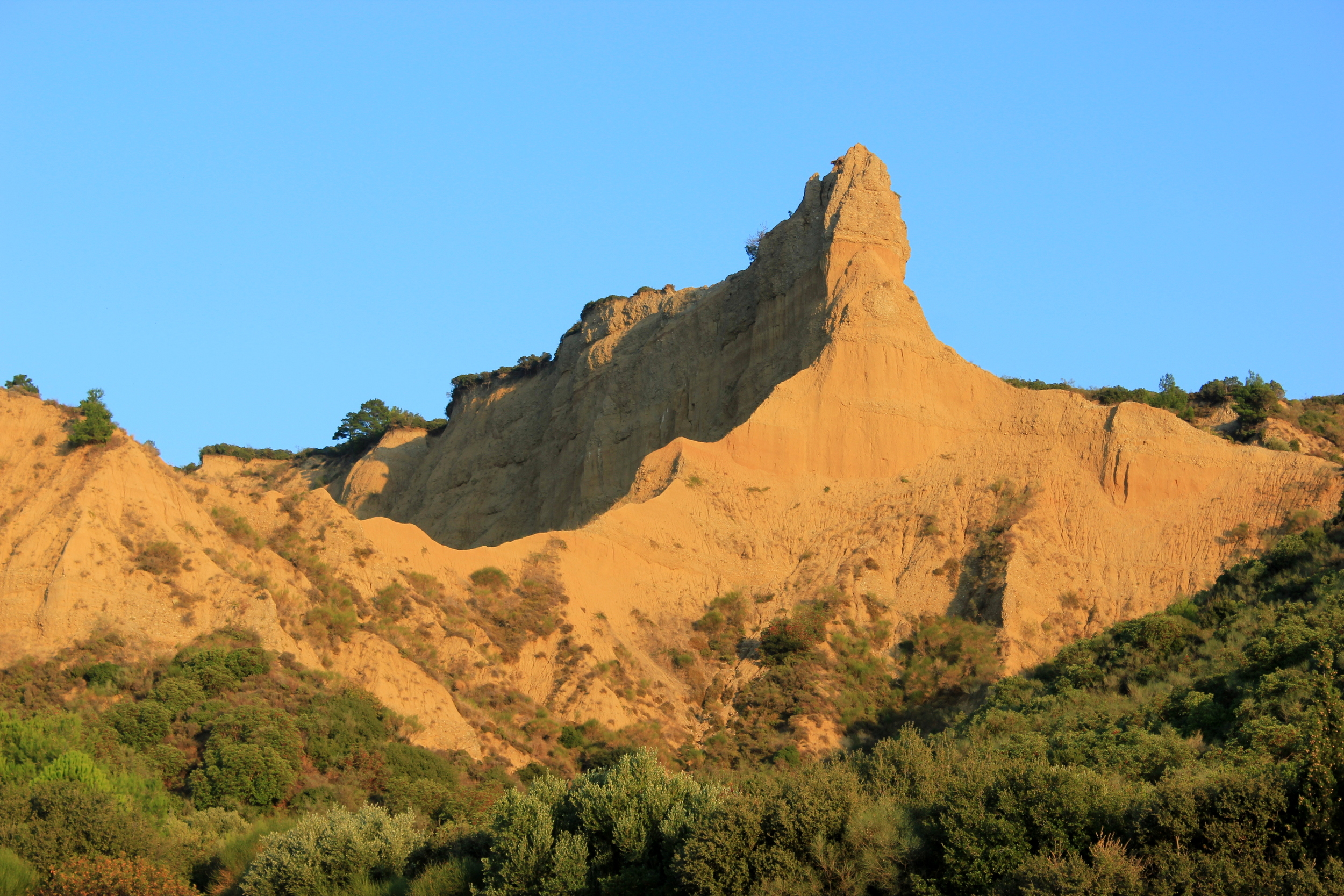
The Sphinx overlooking Anzac Cove

During World War I (1914–1918), French, British, and allied forces (Australian, New Zealand, Newfoundland, Irish and Indian) fought the Gallipoli campaign (1915–1916) in and near the peninsula, seeking to secure a sea route to relieve their eastern ally, Russia. The Ottomans set up defensive fortifications along the peninsula and contained the invading forces.

In early 1915, attempting to seize a strategic advantage in World War I by capturing the Bosporus Strait at Constantinople, the British authorised an attack on the peninsula by French, British, and British Empire forces. The first Australian troops landed at ANZAC Cove early in the morning of 25 April 1915. After eight months of heavy fighting the last Allied soldiers withdrew by 9 January 1916.

The campaign, one of the greatest Ottoman victories during the war, is considered by historians as a humiliating Allied failure. Turks regard it as a defining moment in their nation's history and national identity, contributing to the establishment of the Republic of Turkey eight years later under President Mustafa Kemal Atatürk, who first rose to prominence as a commander at Gallipoli.

The Ottoman Empire instituted the Gallipoli Star as a military decoration in 1915 and awarded it throughout the rest of World War I.

The campaign was the first major military action of Australia and New Zealand (or ANZACs) as independent dominions, setting a foundation for Australian and New Zealand military history, and contributing to their developing national identities. The date of the landing, 25 April, is known as "ANZAC Day". It remains the most significant commemoration of military casualties and "returned soldiers" in Australia and New Zealand.

On the Allied side, one of the promoters of the expedition was Britain's First Lord of the Admiralty, Winston Churchill, whose bullish optimism caused damage to his reputation that took years to repair.

Prior to the Allied landings in April 1915, the Ottoman Empire deported Greek residents from Gallipoli and the surrounding region and from the islands in the sea of Marmara, to the interior where they were at the mercy of hostile Turks. The Greeks had little time to pack and the Ottoman authorities permitted them to take only some bedding and the rest was handed over to the Government. The Turks then plundered the houses and properties. A testimony of a deportee described how the deportees were forced onto crowded steamers, standing-room only, then on disembarking, men of military age were removed (for forced labour in the labour battalions of the Ottoman army).

The Metropolitan bishop of Gallipoli wrote on 17 July 1915 that the extermination of the Christian refugees was methodical. He also mentions that "The Turks, like beasts of prey, immediately plundered all the Christians' property and carried it off. The inhabitants and refugees of my district are entirely without shelter, awaiting to be sent no one knows where ...". Many Greeks died from hunger and there were frequent cases of rape of women and young girls, as well as their forced conversion to Islam. In some cases, Muhacirs appeared in the villages even before the Greek inhabitants were deported and stoned the houses and threatened the inhabitants that they would kill them if they did not leave.

==== Greco-Turkish War (1919–1922) ====
Greek troops occupied Gallipoli on 4 August 1920 during the Greco-Turkish War of 1919–22, considered part of the Turkish War of Independence. After the Armistice of Mudros of 30 October 1918 it became a Greek prefecture centre as Kallipolis. However, Greece was forced to cede Eastern Thrace after the Armistice of Mudanya of October 1922. Gallipoli was briefly handed over to British troops on 20 October 1922, but finally returned to Turkish rule on 26 November 1922.

==== White Russian exiles (1920-1923) ====
In November 1920, after the defeat of the Russian White army of General Pyotr Wrangel, Wrangel's fleet evacuated a significant number of émigré soldiers and their families to Constantinople from the Crimean Peninsula in over 130 vessels; 26,590 of the refugees transferred to Gallipoli. The "Gallipoli internment" involved a camp near the city of Gelibolu, occupied from November 1920 until May 1922. From Gallipoli, many White Russian officers and men dispersed westward to places such as Yugoslavia, Brazil and Bulgaria, where they found refuge.

There are now many cemeteries and war memorials on the Gallipoli peninsula.

=== Turkish Republic ===
Between 1923 and 1926 Gallipoli became the centre of Gelibolu Province, comprising the districts of Gelibolu, Eceabat, Keşan and Şarköy. After the dissolution of the province, it became a district centre in Çanakkale Province.

=== Tourism significance ===
Today, the Gallipoli Peninsula is one of Turkey's most visited historical destinations, attracting hundreds of thousands of domestic and international visitors every year. The Gallipoli Peninsula Historical National Park preserves battlefields, cemeteries, and memorials of the Gallipoli Campaign, and ANZAC Day (25 April) ceremonies draw large numbers of Australians and New Zealanders. Various tour operators offer guided tours of the battlefields, memorials, and museums to help visitors understand the significance of the campaign.

== Notable people ==
- Ahmed Bican (1398 – c. 1466), author
- Piri Reis (1465/70 – 1553), admiral, geographer and cartographer
- Mustafa Âlî (1541–1600), Ottoman historian, politician and writer
- Sofia Vembo (1910–1978), Greek singer and actress
