= List of ancient cities in Thrace and Dacia =

This is a list of ancient cities, towns, villages, and fortresses in and around Thrace and Dacia. A number of these settlements were Thracian and Dacian, but some were Celtic, Greek, Roman, Paeonian, or Persian.

A number of cities in Thrace and Dacia were built on or close to the sites of preexisting Dacian or Thracian settlements. Some settlements in this list may have a double entry, such as the Paeonian Astibo and Latin Astibus. It is believed that Thracians did not build true cities even if they were named as such; the largest Thracian settlements were large villages. The only known attempt to build a polis by the Thracians was Seuthopolis., although Strabo considered the Thracian cities with "bria" ending polises. Some of the Dacian settlements and fortresses employed the traditional Murus Dacicus construction technique.

Note: Throughout these lists, an asterisk [*] indicates that the toponym is reconstructed.

== Thracian and Dacian ==
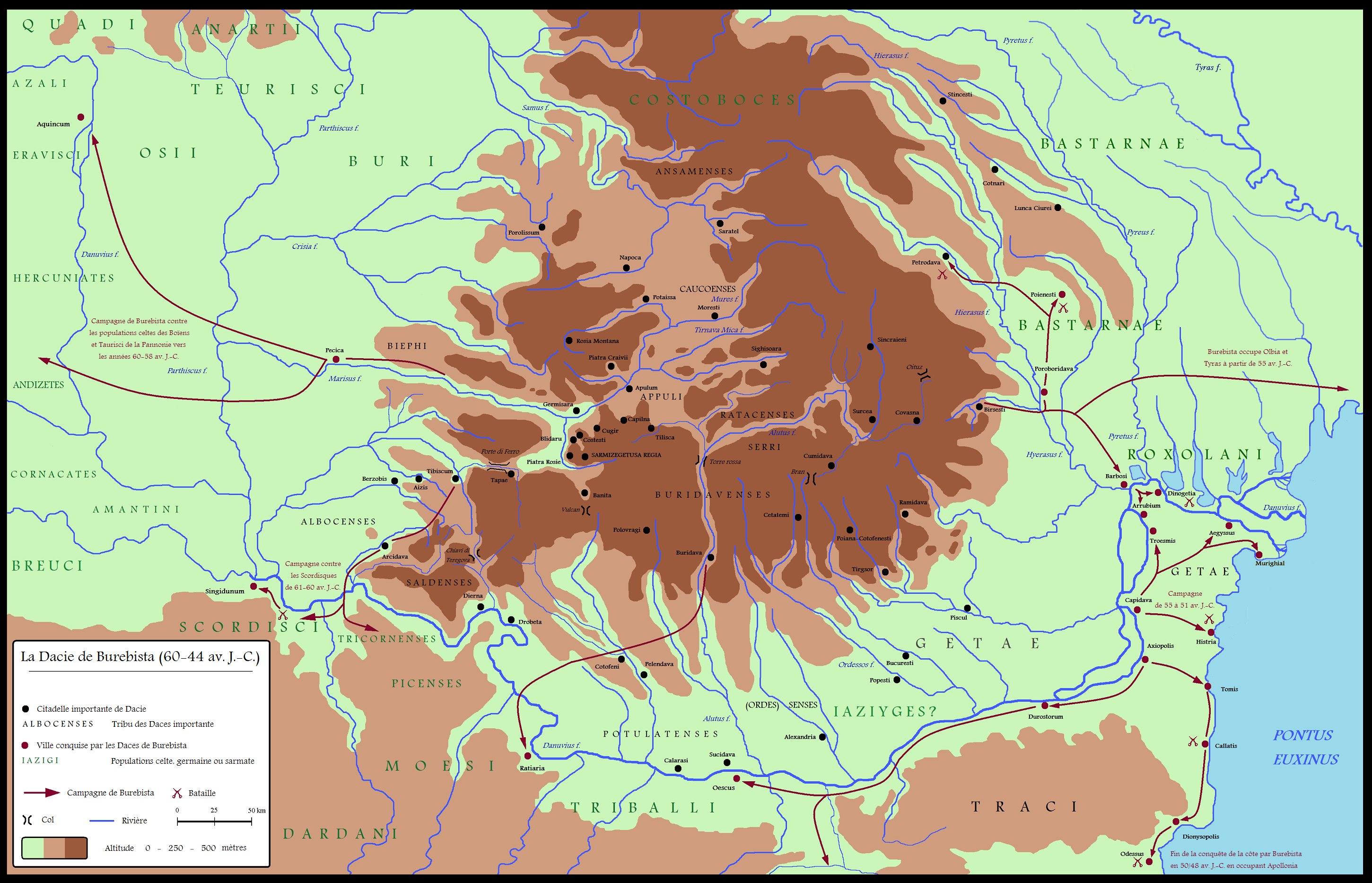
Dacian towns and fortresses in Dacia during Burebista

- Abydos
- Acidava (Acidaua), a fortress town close to the Danube, located in today's Piatra-Olt, Olt County, Romania
- Acmonia or Agatapara
- Abdera
- Aedava (Aedeva, Aedabe, Aedeba or Aedadeba), placed by Procopius on the Danubian road between Augustae and Variana, in Moesia (the present Northern Bulgaria)
- Aedeva, modern Pernik
- Aiadava (Aiadaba or Aeadaba, Greek: Αἰάδαβα), a locality in the Remesiana region in present-day Bela Palanka, Serbia
- Aizis (Aixis, Aixim, Airzis, Azizis, Azisis, Aizisis, Alzisis, Aigis, Aigizidava*, Zizis), mentioned by Emperor Trajan in Dacica
- Amutria (Amutrion, Amutrium, Ancient Greek: Ἀμούτριον), a Dacian town close to the Danube, possibly today's Motru, Gorj County, Romania
- Apulon (Apoulon, Apula), a fortress city close to modern Alba-Iulia, Romania from which the Latin name of Apulum is derived
- Arcina (Arcinna), a fortress town in Wallachia
- Apsynthus, the Thracian name for Aenus
- Arcobadara
- Argedava (Argedauon, Sargedava, Sargedauon, Zargedava, Zargedauon, Ancient Greek: Αργεδαυον, Σαργεδαυον), mentioned in the Decree of Dionysopolis, potentially the dava discovered at Popești, a district in the town of Mihăilești, Giurgiu County, Romania and maybe Burebista's court or capital
- Argidava (Argidaua, Arcidava, Arcidaua, Argedava, Argedauon, Sargedava, Sargedauon, Zargedava, Zargedauon, Ancient Greek: Ἀργίδαυα, Αργεδαυον, Σαργεδαυον), potentially Burebista's court or capital, located in today's Vărădia, Caraș-Severin County, Romania
- Artanes, modern Lom
- Arutela
- Apulon, capital of the Apuli
- Atipara
- Bergula
- Berzobis, ancient Bârzava, Romania
- Bergula, modern (Luleburgaz)
- Beroea, modern Stara Zagora
- Bessapara of the Bessi tribe, today Sinitovo
- Bizye, capital of the Odrysae
- Bregedava
- Breierophara, near modern Komotini
- Buricodava
- Buridava (Burridava), today's Ocnele Mari, Romania
- Buteridava
- Cabassus
- Capidava (Kapidaua), a fortress town on the southern side of the lower Danube
- Caria, modern Shabla
- Carsidava or Karsidaua
- Cedonia, near Sibiu
- Crenides
- Cumidava (Comidava, Komidaua), ancient Râșnov, Romania
- Cypasis
- Danedebai,
- Dausdava (Dausadava, Dausdavua), "The shrine of wolves", a fortress town close to the Danube
- Debelt
- Dentheletica, capital of the Dentheletae tribe, modern Kyustendil
- Desudaba or Maedius of the Maedi tribe, modern Sandanski
- Diacum
- Dierna
- Dinogetia, located above the Danube delta
- Docidava or Dokidaua
- Drabeskos
- Drobeta, located on the left bank of the Danube at Turnu Severin
- Drusipara
- Egeta
- Eumolpias, later Pulpudeva translating Philippopolis, the name resulted in modern Plovdiv, prehistoric settlement
- Gazoros
- Genucla, settlement located south of the Danube
- Germania, "hot water", modern Sapareva Banya, site of the Dentheletae tribe
- Germisara "hot water"
- Gildova (Gildoba), located along the Vistula river
- Giridava
- Iamphorynna, capital of the Maedi tribe
- Itadeba (Itadava)
- Ismara
- Istria (Olbia)
- Jidava, near Câmpulung Muscel, Romania
- Jidova
- Kabyle of the Kabileti tribe, capital of the Odrysae
- Kipsela, modern Ipsala
- Lygos, modern Istanbul
- Malva, a Dacian settlement where Roman Romula was built
- Marcodava (Dacia) (Markodaua)
- Melsambria, modern Nessebar
- Melta, modern Lovech
- Murideba
- Mutzipara* Napoca, ancient Cluj-Napoca, Romania
- Naulochas, modern Obzor
- Nentinava (Netindaua), ancient Slobozia, Romania
- Nentivava, ancient Olteniţa, Romania
- Netindava
- Nipsa near Panisus
- Oescus of the Triballi tribe
- Odryssa or Uscudama, modern Edirne, capital of the Odrysae or Bessi tribe
- Onokarsis, capital residence of the Odrysae, possibly modern Starosel
- Pelendava (Pelendova), ancient Craiova, Romania
- Perburidava
- Perperikon
- Piroboridava
- Petra, fort of Maedi
- Petrodava (Petrodaua), located in Piatra Neamț
- Piroboridava (Piroboridaua)
- Polondava
- Potaissa (Patavissa), ancient Turda, Romania, also named as Patruissa
- Quemedava, mentioned by Procopius in Dardania
- Ramidava (Rhamidaua)
- Ratiaria
- Recidava
- Remesiana
- Rusidava (Rusidava)
- Sacidava (Sacidaba)
- Sagadava
- Salmydessos, modern Kıyıköy, residence of the Odrysae
- Sarmizegetusa (Sarmisegetuza), Decebalus's capital and holy place
- Scaidava (Skedeba)
- Scaptopara, of the Dentheletae tribe, modern Blagoevgrad
- Selymbria, modern Silivri in European Turkey
- Serdica of the Serdi tribe, modern Sofia
- Setidava (Setidaua), mentioned by Ptolemy as a thriving settlement
- Seuthopolis
- Singidava (Singidaua)
- Sintica of the Sintoi tribe
- Subzupara
- Sucidava (Suvidava, Sukidaua), located in Corabia, Olt County, Romania
- Susudava, mentioned by Ptolemy as a thriving settlement
- Tamasidava (Tamasidaua)
- Tapae, a Dacian outpost guarding Sarmisegetuza and the site of two major battles between Dacians and Romans
- Teichos, residence of the Odryssae
- Therma of the Mygdones tribe, modern Thessaloniki
- Thermidava, placed by Ptolemy on the Lissus-Naissus route. The toponym is most probably a misreading of a settlement which most scholars in contemporary research locate near present-day Banat, Serbia.
- Thynia, town of the Thyni
- Tibiscum
- Tirista (Tsirista)
- Tranupara
- Tsierna (Dierna)
- Tyrida
- Tyrodiza
- Urdoviza, modern Kiten
- Zaldapa
- Zargidava (Zargidaua)
- Zeugma
- Zidava
- Zikideva
- Zimnicea, site where Alexander the Great fought the Dacians
- Ziridava (Ziridaua), identified archaeologically with Pecica, Arad, Romania
- Zisnedeva (Zisnudeva, Zisnudeba), located in Dacian Moesia
- Zurobara

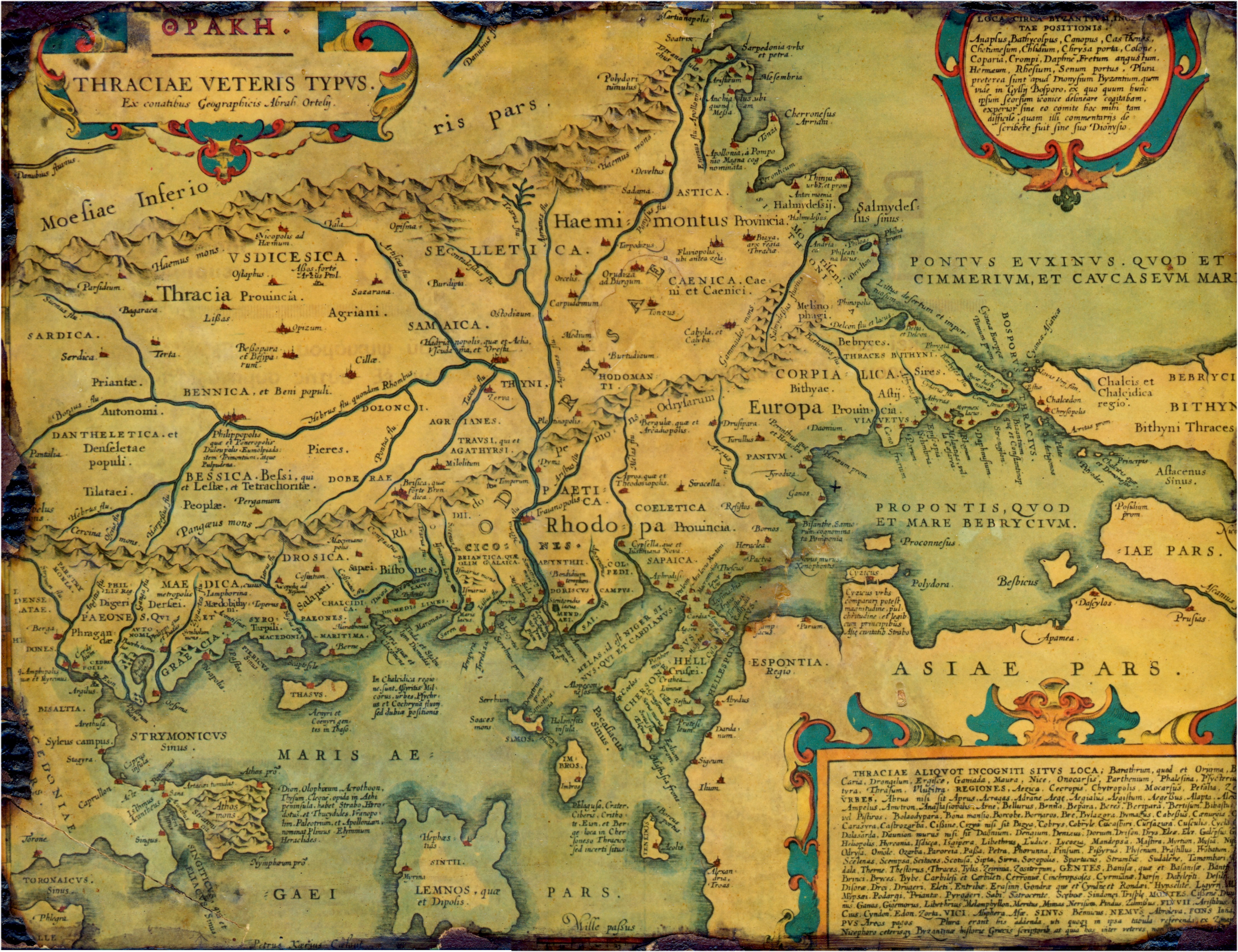
Map of Ancient Thrace made by Abraham Ortelius, at 1585

=== Unknown names ===
Aghireșu
Ardan
Ardeu
Arpașu de Sus
Augustin
Băile Tușnad
Băleni-Români
Bănița
Bâzdâna
Beidaud
Bocșa
Boroșneu Mic
Boșorod
Botfei
Breaza
Bretea Mureșană
Bucium
Căpâlna
Cernat
Cetățeni
Cioclovina
Clopotiva
"Costești-Blidaru"
"Costești-Cetățuie"
Cotnari
Coțofenii din Dos
Covasna
Cozia
Crăsanii de Jos
Crivești
Crizbav
Cuciulata
"Cucuiș - Dealul Golu"
"Cucuiș - Vârful Berianului"
Cugir
Cârlomănești
Dalboșeț
Densuș
Divici
Drajna de Sus
Dumitrița
Eliseni
Feldioara
"Fețele Albe"
Grădiștea de Munte
Iedera de Jos
Feleac
Jigodin
Liubcova
Mala Kopania
Marca
Mataraua
Merești
Moinești
Monariu
Monor
Moșna
Ocolișu Mic
Odorheiu Secuiesc
Olteni
Orăștie Mountains
Petrila
Petroșani
"Piatra Roșie"
Pietroasa Mică
Pinticu
Pisculești
Poiana cu Cetate
Polovragi
Ponor
Popești (Călărași)
Porumbenii Mari
Praid
Racoș
Racu
Radovanu - Gorgana I
Radovanu - Jidovescu
Roadeș
Rovinari
Rușor
Sacalasău
Satu Mare (Harghita)
Satu Nou
Sânzieni
Seimeni
Socol
Sprâncenata
Stâncești
Stoina
Șeica Mică
Tășad
Telița
Teliu
Tilișca
Timișu de Jos
Turia
Unip
Uroi
Valea Seacă
Viișoara Moșneni
Zemplín
Zetea

== Thraco-Illyrian ==
- Chesdupara
- Daradapara
- Scupi of the Dardani tribe
- Sirmium

== Thrace and Macedonia ==
=== Thrace, from Strymon to Nestos ===
- Amphipolis, founded by colonists from Athens
- Akontisma
- Antisara
- Creston, modern Kilkis
- Datos, founded by colonists from Thasos
- Drabeskos
- Eion, founded by colonists from Athens
- Ennea Hodoi
- Galepsus, founded by colonists from Thasos
- Gasoros
- Heraclea Sintica
- Krenides, founded by colonists from Thasos
- Mastira, mentioned by Demosthenes (341 BCE) in his "The Oration on the State of the Chersonesus". This town was unknown to the scholar Harpocration (100-200 CE), who suggests that instead of "Mastira" we should read "Bastira", a known Thracian town of that name.
- Myrkinos, founded by colonists from Miletus in 497 BC
- Neapolis, founded by colonists from Thasos, modern Kavala
- Oesyme, founded by colonists from Thasos
- Paroikopolis
- Pergamos
- Phagres, founded by colonists from Thasos
- Philippi, founded by Philip II of Macedon, rebuilt Crenides
- Philippopolis (modern Plovdiv)
- Pistyros, founded by colonists from Thasos
- Sirra, founded by Philip II of Macedon, rebuilt town of the Siriopeoni, modern Serres
- Skapte Hyle
- Skotoussa
- Tristolos

=== Thrace, from Nestos to Hebros ===
- Abdera, founded by colonists from Klazomenai
- Ainos (Poltymbria) founded by colonists from Alopeke, Mytilene, and Kyme
- Bergepolis, founded by colonists from Abdera
- Doriskos
- Drys, founded by colonists from Samothrace
- Dikaia, founded by colonists from Samos
- Kypsela
- Larissa
- Maroneia, founded by colonists from Chios
- Menebria, founded by colonists from Samothrace on a town named Melsambria, modern Nessebar
- Orthagoria
- Sale, founded by colonists from Samothrace
- Stryme, founded from colonists from Thasos
- Zone, founded by colonists from Samothrace

=== Inland Thrace ===
- Alexandropolis Maedica
- Beroea, founded by Philip II of Macedon in 342 BC
- Philippopolis (Philippopolis), today's city of Plovdiv in Bulgaria. First settlements around 5th millennium B.C., but some data points for earlier dating. The Thracian name “Pulpudeva” was later renamed to “Philippopolis” due to the increased Greek influence.
- Stanimachos, founded by colonists from Istiaia, modern Asenovgrad
- Pistiros, founded by Pistyrians from the coast

=== Thracian Chersonesos ===
- Aegospotami (Aegospotamos)
- Alokopennesos, founded by colonists from Aeolis
- Araplos
- Callipolis
- Chersonesos (Agora), founded by colonists from Athens
- Derris
- Elaious, founded by colonists from Athens
- Ide
- Kardia, founded by colonists from Athens
- Kressa
- Krithotai, founded by colonists from Athens
- Limnae, founded by colonists from Miletus
- Madytos, founded by colonists from Lesbos
- Pactya, founded by colonists from Athens
- Paion
- Sestos, founded by colonists from Lesbos

=== Propontic Thrace ===
- Athyra
- Byzantion, founded by colonists from Megara on a town called Lygos, modern Istanbul
- Bisanthe, founded by colonists from Samos
- Daminon Teichos
- Ergiske
- Heraclea (Perinthus)
- Heraion, founded by colonists from Samos
- Lysimachia
- Neapolis (Thracian Chersonese), founded by colonists from Athens
- Orestias, rebuilt
- Perinthus, founded by colonists from Samos
- Rhaedestus, founded by colonists from Samos
- Serrion Teichos
- Selymbria, modern Silivri in European Turkey, of Thracian etymology
- Tyrodiza, of Thracian etymology

=== West Pontic coast ===
- Aegyssos, modern Tulcea
- Aquae Calidae
- Ahtopol, founded by colonists from Athens
- Anchialos, modern Pomorie, founded by colonists from Appolonia
- Apollonia, modern Sozopol, founded by Ionians
- Berga, founded by colonists from Thasos
- Bizone, founded by colonists from Miletus, modern Kavarna
- Krutoi, modern Balchik founded by Miletian colonists
- Dionysopolis, modern Balchik, founded by colonists from Miletus
- Heliopolis, modern Obzor
- Histria, founded by colonists from Miletus
- Kallatis (Callatis), founded from colonists from Herakleia Pontike, modern-day Mangalia, Romania
- Mesembria, modern Nesebar, settled during the 6th century BC by Dorians from Megara
- Odessos, modern Varna, founded by colonists from Miletus
- Nikonion, founded by colonists from Istros
- Salmydessos (from IE *salm-udes, "salty water"; cf. Greek álmē, "sea water, brine"; ýdos, "water")
- Tomis, modern Constanta, rebuilt Scythian town

=== Other ===
- Aison
- Brea, founded by colonists from Athens,
- Gazoros
- Heraclea Sintica on a tribe of the Sintoi tribe
- Kossaia

== Persian ==
- Boryza (city)
- Doriscus

== Roman ==
Cities during the Roman period

- Abritus
- Acumincum
- Ad Medium
- Agura Piatra (Regianum)
- Appiaria
- Apros
- Aquis
- Augustae
- Augusta Traiana (formerly Beroe, later Stara Zagora)
- Burgenae
- Camistrum
- Caenophrurium
- Cypsella
- Deultum, rebuilt Debelt
- Deltum
- Diocletianopolis (modern Hisarya)
- Doracium
- Durorstorum, modern Silistra
- Drobeta
- Gensis
- Hadrianople, rebuild Uscudama
- Justiniana Prima
- Margus
- Marcianopolis, modern Devnya
- Maximianopolis
- Morisena
- Montana
- Nicopolis ad Istrum
- Nicopolis ad Nestum, rebuilt Alexandrupolis
- Novae
- Oescus
- Pautalia, modern Kyustendil
- Pescium, modern Peć
- Plotinopolis, modern Hissarya,
- Porolissum
- Resculum (castra Remesiana)
- Sexagnita Prista, modern Ruse
- Sirmium
- Theranda
- Traianopolis
- Transmarisca, modern Tutrakan
- Tropaeum Traiani
- Turres, modern Pirot
- Ulmetum
- Ulpiana
- Ulpia Traiana Sarmizegetusa
- Valve, modern Vratsa
- Vicianum, modern Vučitrn
- Viminacium
- Zaldapa
- Zikideva
- the rest after conquest

== Celtic ==
- Dunonia, modern Vidin
- Malata
- Naissus, modern Niš
- Noviodunum
- Serdica, modern Sofia
- Singidunum, modern Belgrade
- Taurunum
- Tylis

== See also ==
- List of ancient tribes in Thrace and Dacia
- List of rulers of Thrace and Dacia
- List of ancient cities in Illyria
- List of rulers of Illyria
- Dacian Dava
- Dacian Fortresses of the Orăştie Mountains
- Tabula Peutingeriana
- Notitia Dignitatum
- List of kings of Thrace and Dacia
