= Datus (Greece) =

Ancient Greek city in Macedonia

Datus or Datos (Ancient Greek: Δάτος), also Datum or Daton (Δάτον and Δᾶτον), was an ancient Greek city located in Macedonia, specifically in the region between the river Strymon and the river Nestos. It was founded by colonists from Thasos at 360 BCE, with the help and support of the Athenian exiled orator Callistratus of Aphidnae. Datos was a seaport, close to Mount Pangaion with its rich gold veins and to another Thasian colony, Crenides. The two colonies provoked the Thracians but at the same time gave Philip II of Macedon the justification for penetrating the area and founding Philippi in 356 BCE. The name was also applied to a wide region. There was some conjecture that Datus was the same as the later Neapolis (near modern Kavala), A proverb current in antiquity celebrated Datus for its "good things."

== See also ==
- Greek colonies in Thrace
