= Drys (Thrace) =

Coordinates: 40°51′23″N 25°40′31″E

Drys (Ancient Greek: Δρῦς) was an ancient Greek town of ancient Thrace.

Harpocration collects a passage from Theopompus according to which Drys was founded by the Athenian general Iphicrates. Demosthenes also cites the city of Drys in relation to Iphicrates but does not mention the latter as a founder but as a resident, after having resided in Amphissa. In the Periplus of Pseudo-Scylax Drys and Zone are mentioned as neighboring cities of Maroneia, Dicaea and Abdera but located in the interior.

The city must have belonged to the Delian League since it appears in an Athenian decree of the year 422/1 BCE. According to an account by Polyaenus, the Spartan army commanded by Ischolaus (Ἰσχόλαος) was besieged by the Athenian army under Chabrias in the city of Drys. When the Athenians approached with battering rams to try to knock down the city wall, Ischolaus' defense consisted in getting ahead of him and demolishing part of the wall so that his soldiers fought with more courage for not having the protection of the wall and also to show the Athenians their contempt for siege engines. The Athenians, frightened at the voluntary demolition of the walls, did not dare to attack the city. The town is also mentioned by Stephanus of Byzantium and in the Suda.

Its location has been much discussed and some authors have even suggested that it could be identified with Orthagoria or with Mesembria, however it seems to have been located 2.5 miles (4.0 km) east of Mesembria.

== See also ==
- Greek colonies in Thrace
