= Mesambria (Aegean Sea) =

Ancient Greek colony in modern Bulgaria

Coordinates: 40°51′48″N 25°38′19″E

Mesambria (Ancient Greek: Μεσαμβρία), or Mesembria (Μεσημβρία), was an ancient Greek city located in ancient Thrace, on the coast of the Aegean Sea.

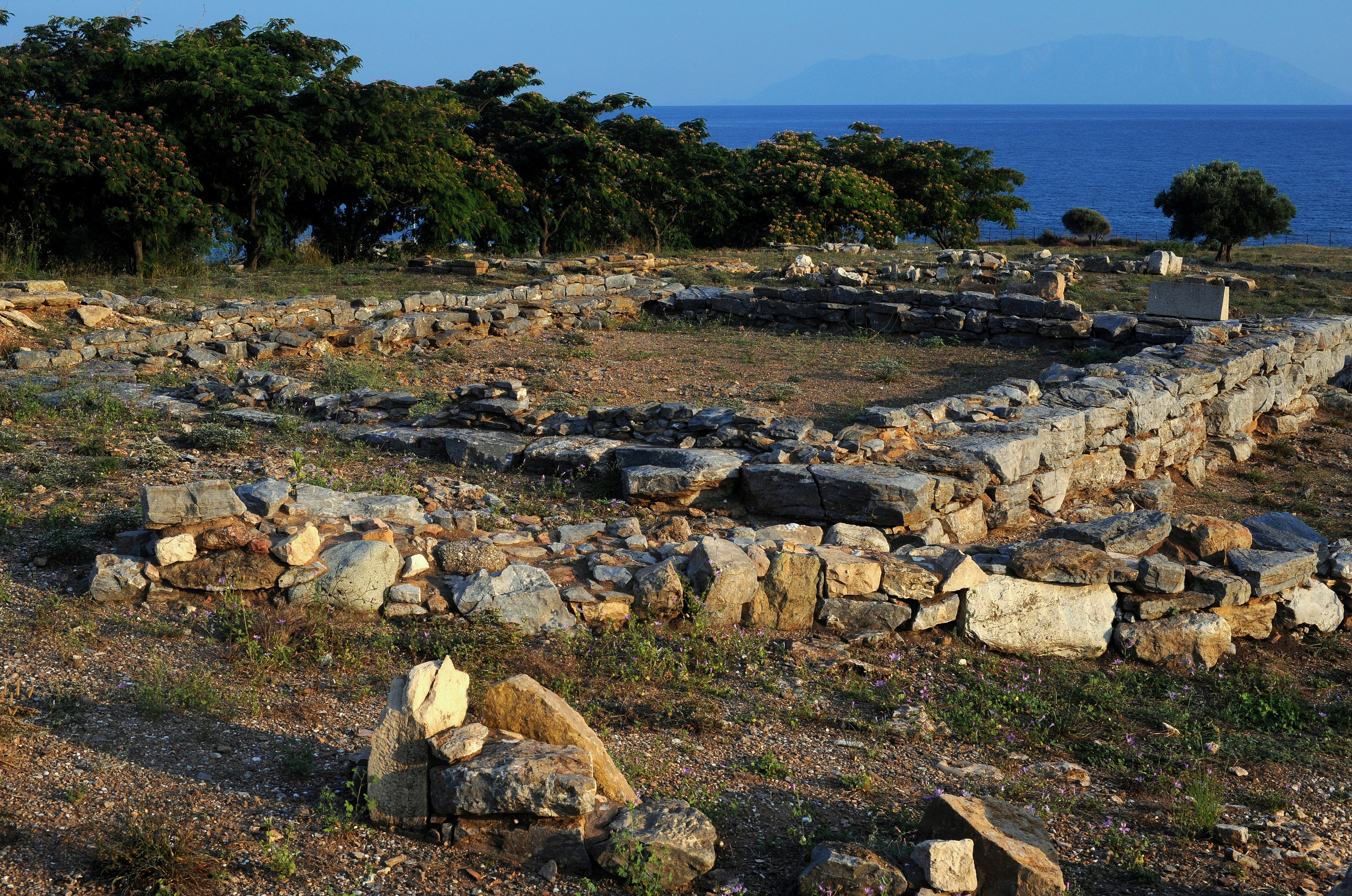
Archaeological site of Mesembria

According to Herodotus, it was a bastion that had been founded by Samothrace, was a neighbor of the city of Stryme and in the middle of the two ran the Lissus River. The army of Xerxes passed Mesambria during the expedition against Greece in 480 BCE.

Its site is tentatively located near Shabla-Dere, 12 miles (19 km) west of Alexandroupolis; but it has been suggested that Mesambria could be identified with Drys, or with Orthagoria, or with Zone.

== See also ==
- Greek colonies in Thrace
