= Mesembria (disambiguation) =

Mesembria, modern Nesebar, is an ancient Greek city in Thrace, on the Black Sea coast of Bulgaria.

Mesembria or Messembria or Mesambria may also refer to:

- Mesembria (Zone), the ancient Greek polis of Zone, on the Aegean coast of Western Thrace, Greece, whose archaeological remains were formerly identified as "Mesembria"
- Mesambria (Aegean Sea), another ancient Greek settlement on the Aegean coast of Western Thrace (exact location unknown)
- Mesimvria, Evros, a modern Greek village near Mesembria–Zone.
