= Petrila (disambiguation) =

Petrila is a town in Romania.

Petrila may also refer to:

- Claudiu Petrila (born 2000), Romanian footballer
- Dacian fortress of Petrila
- Mihaela Petrilă, Romanian rower
- Petrila Coal Mine in Petrila
