= Murus Dacicus =

Construction method for defensive walls

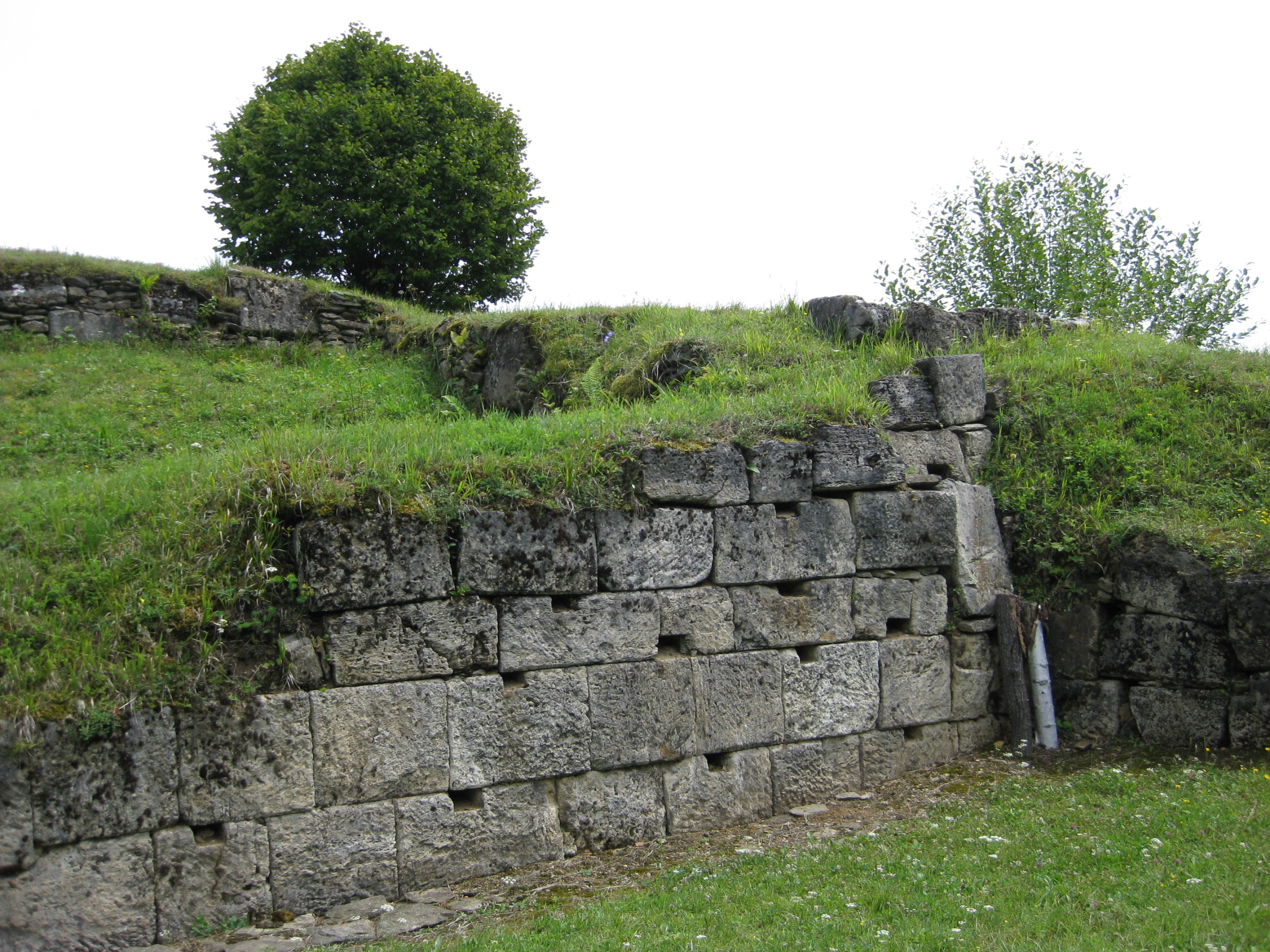
Murus Dacicus at the Dacian Fortress "Blidaru".

Murus Dacicus (Latin for Dacian Wall) is a construction method for defensive walls and fortifications developed in ancient Dacia sometime before the Roman conquest. It is a mix between traditional construction methods particular to Dacian builders and methods imported from Greek and Roman architecture and masonry, and – although somewhat similar construction techniques were used before, during and long after the period – it has peculiarities that make it unique.

== Design ==
Murus Dacicus consisted of two outer walls made out of stone blocks carved in the shape of a rectangular parallelepiped; apparently no mortar was used, thus making them examples of ashlar masonry – but typically done with regular sized, bigger-than-average blocks, due to technological requirements. After each layer of the outer walls was completed, the gap between them would be filled with gravel and rocks cemented together with clay and compacted (cf. also rammed earth technique). The structure was strengthened and consolidated at the level of each layer by horizontal, singed/scorched wood tie beams connected to the outer walls by means of a dovetail joint at the upper surface of the stone block (hence the need for big stone blocks of the same size). Due to its higher flexibility, this structure had a distinct advantage over the 'classical', solid dry stone wall (as seen, e. g., in the cyclopean and ashlar walls in Mycenae): a higher capability of shock absorption and dissipation of kinetic energy from an incoming projectile thrown by a siege weapon. However, archaeological and historical evidence suggests that the wall might have been topped by a wooden palisade instead of stone battlements, which had the obvious disadvantage of being vulnerable to fire.

A properly built Dacian Wall would be both labor-intensive and time-consuming. A typical wall for the late period, hastily built in the years between the two Dacian Wars (when Dacia had to rebuild, repair, enlarge or reinforce the defenses of many of its key fortresses), would be about 3–4 meters thick and 10 m tall, an outstanding achievement in the given conditions.

The Dacian Fortresses of the Orăştie Mountains, UNESCO World Heritage Sites are examples of citadels built using this method. Also the Dacian walls are depicted on the Trajan's Column in Rome.

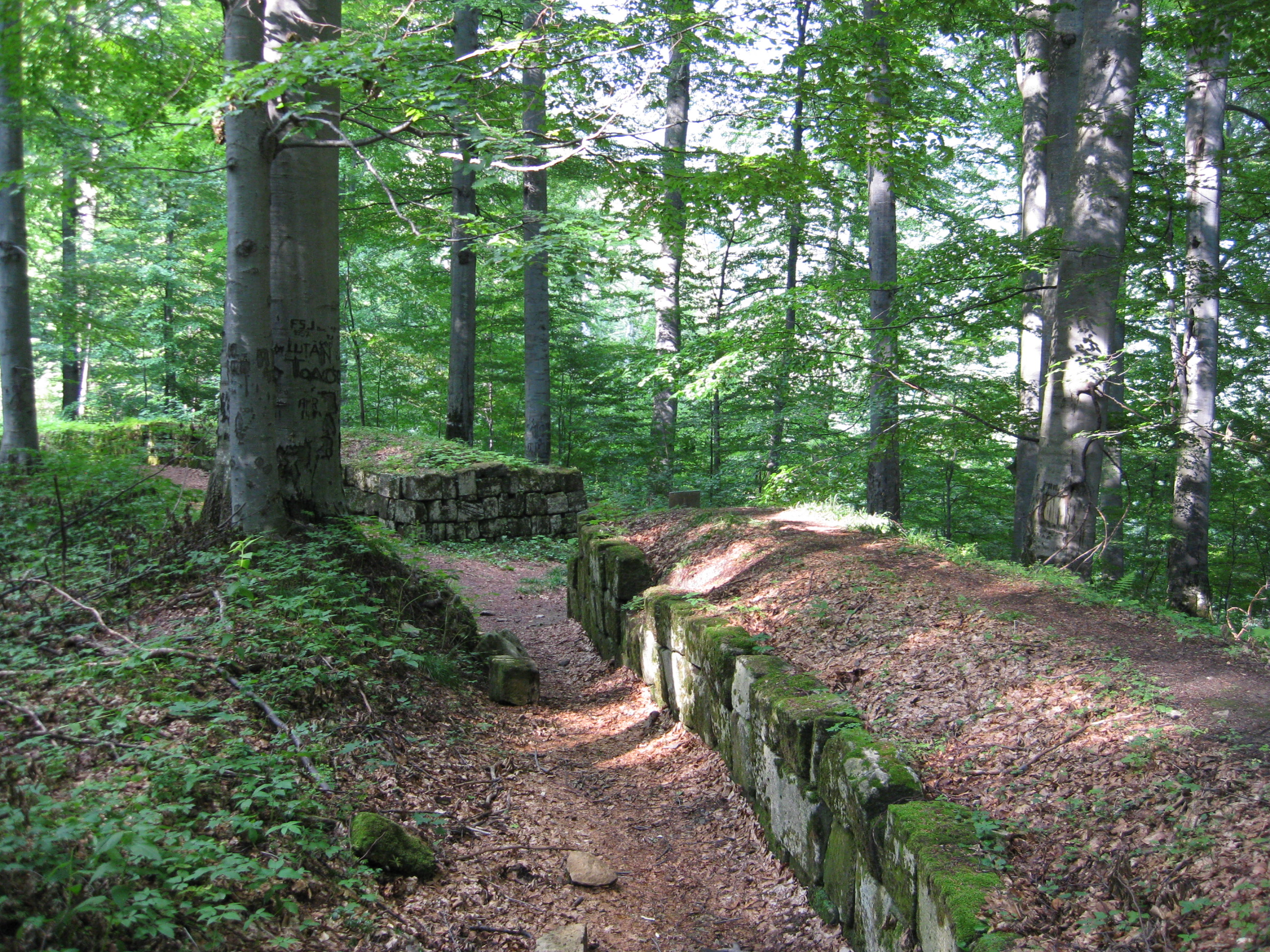
Sarmizegetusa Regia, Romania

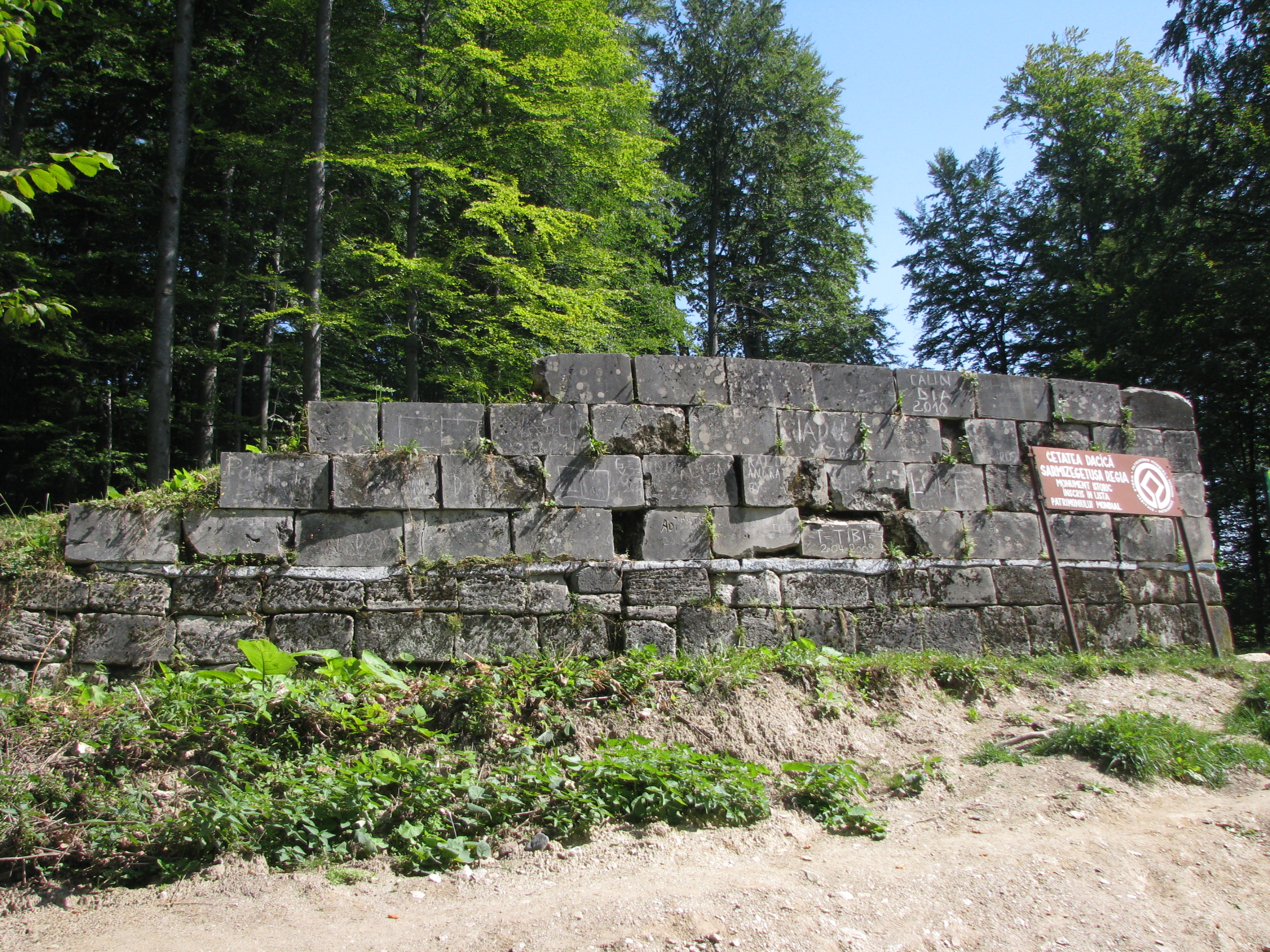
Sarmizegetusa Regia, Romania

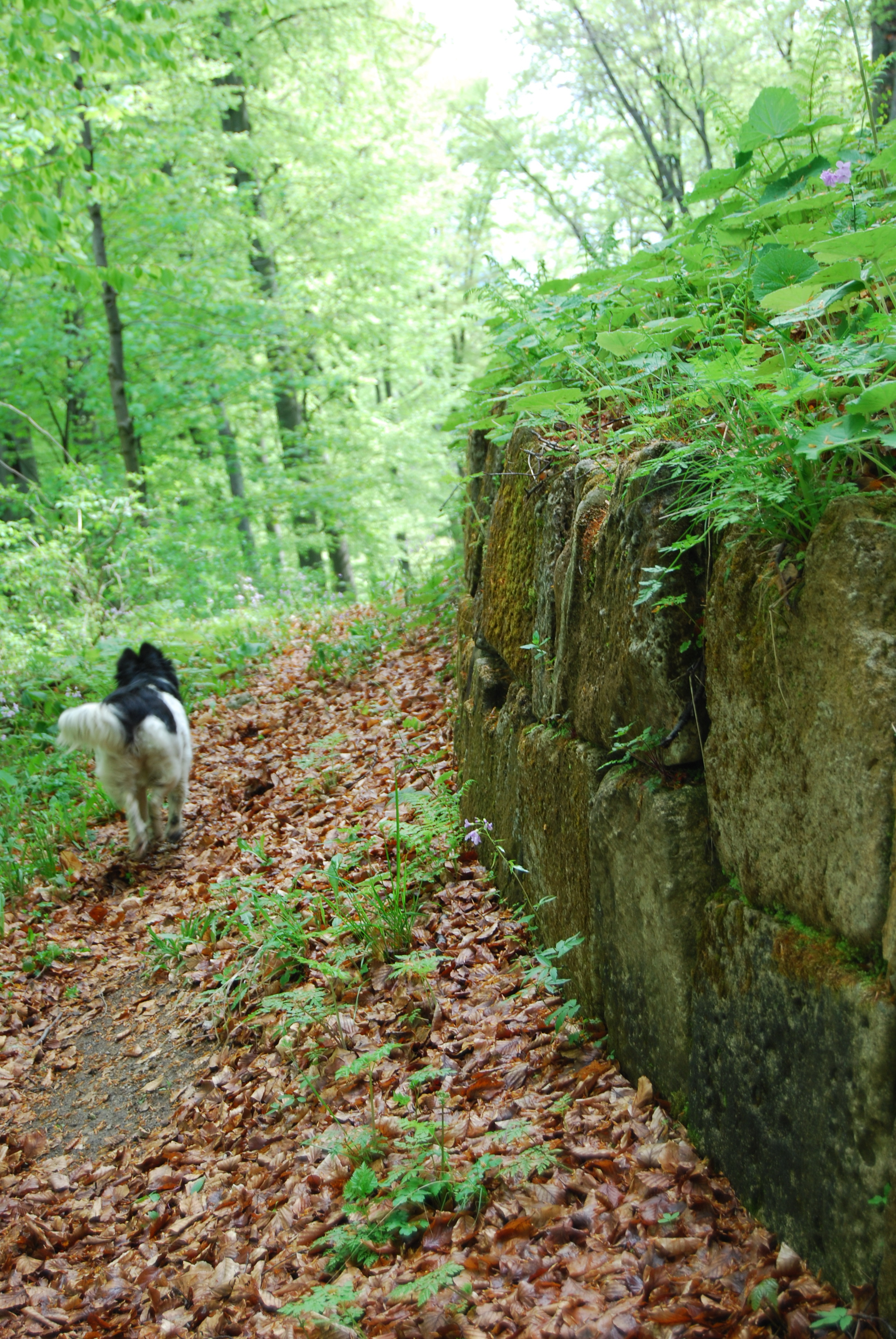
Sarmizegetusa Regia, Romania

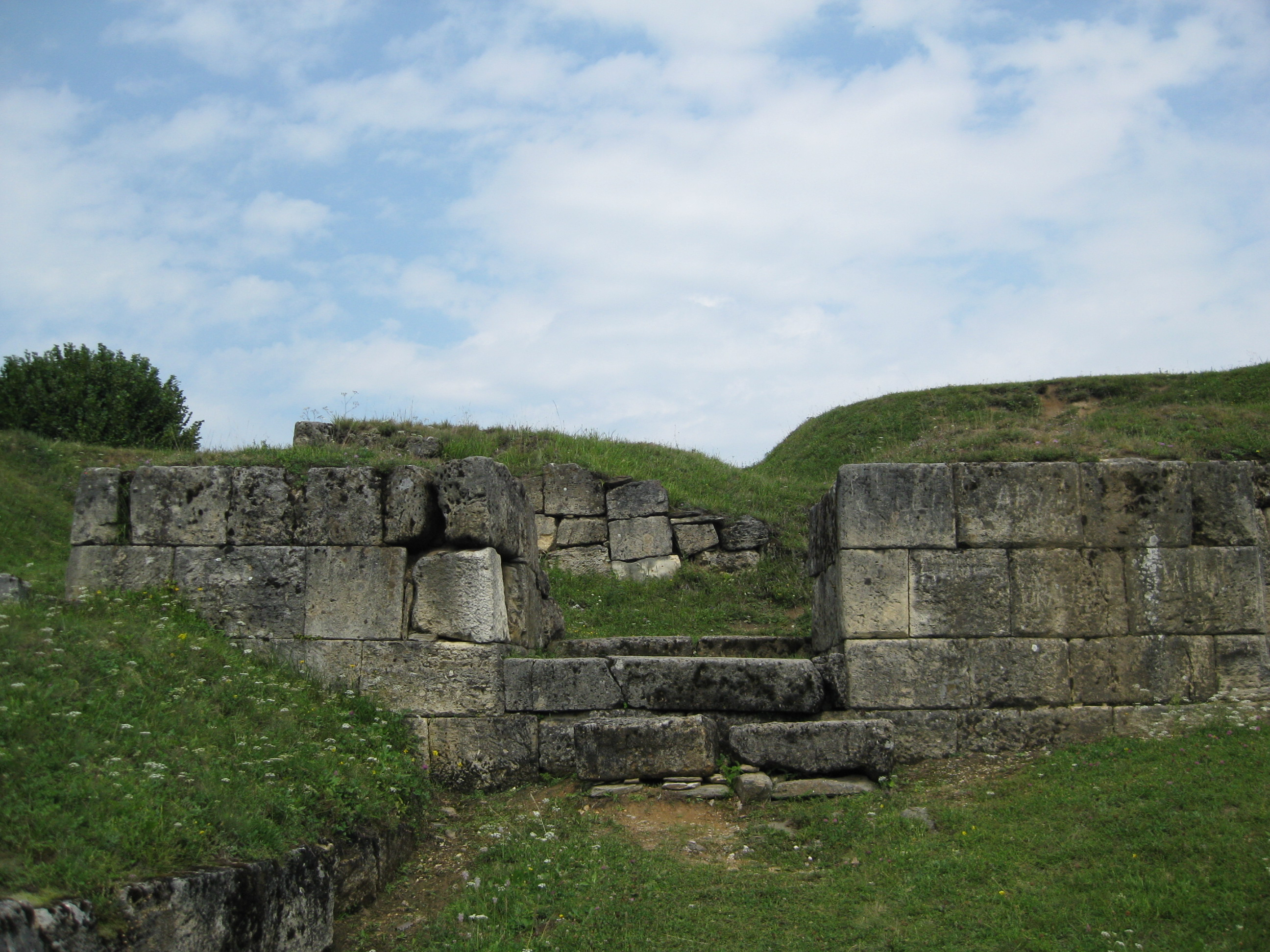
Dacian Fortress "Blidaru", Romania

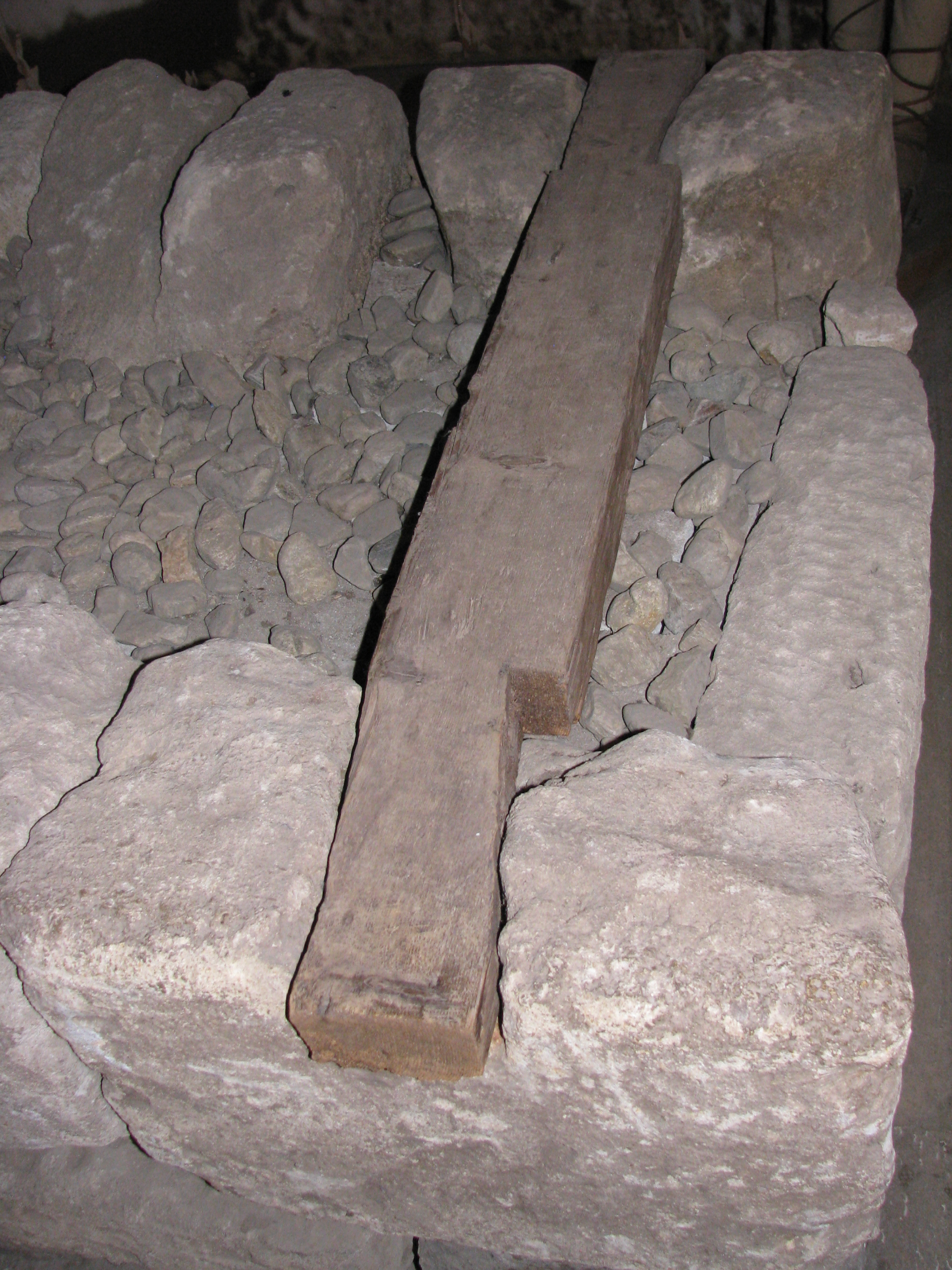
Wall from Piatra Craivii Dacian Fortress in display at the National Museum of the Union, Alba Iulia

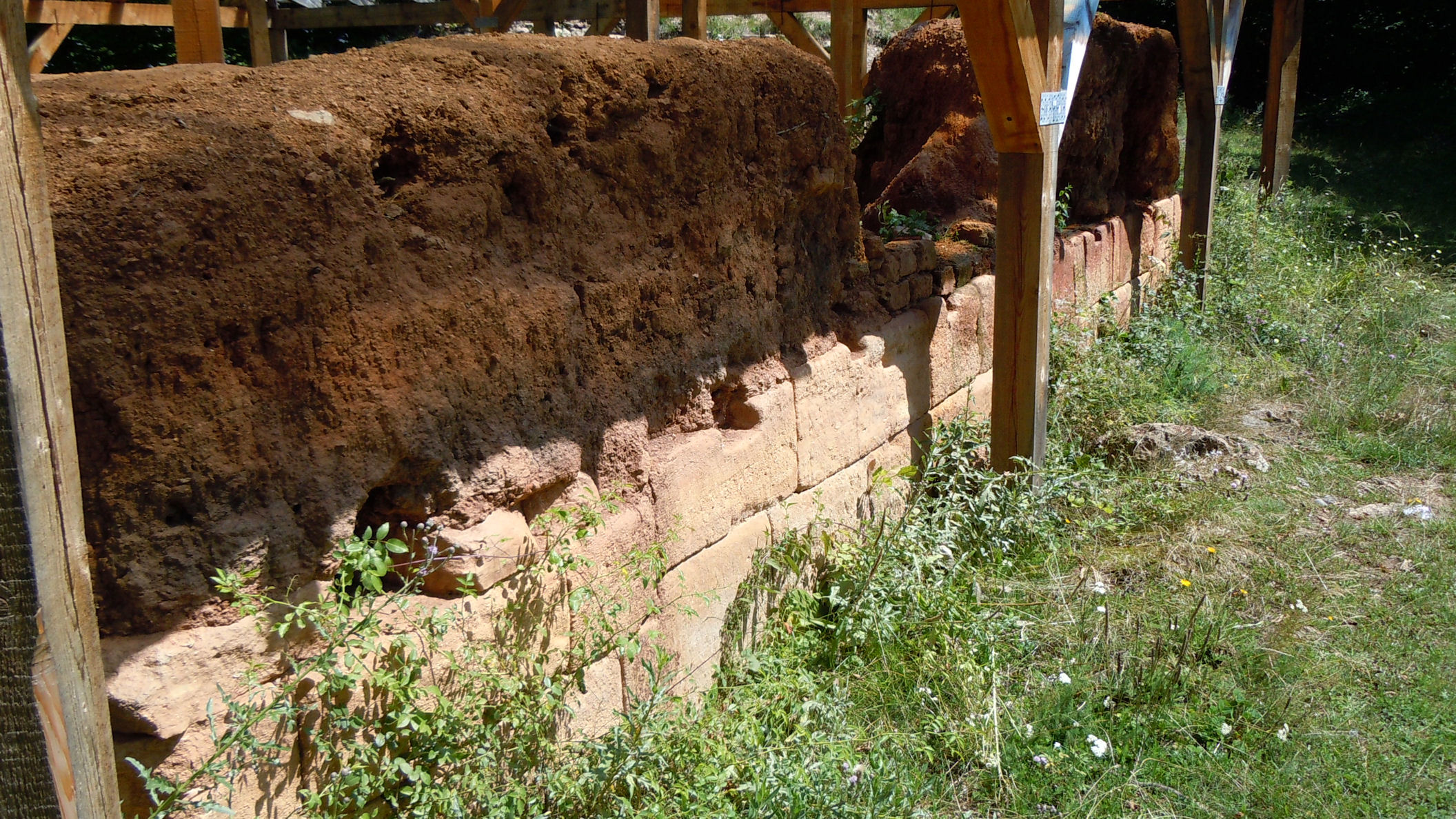
Dacian fortress of Tilișca, Romania

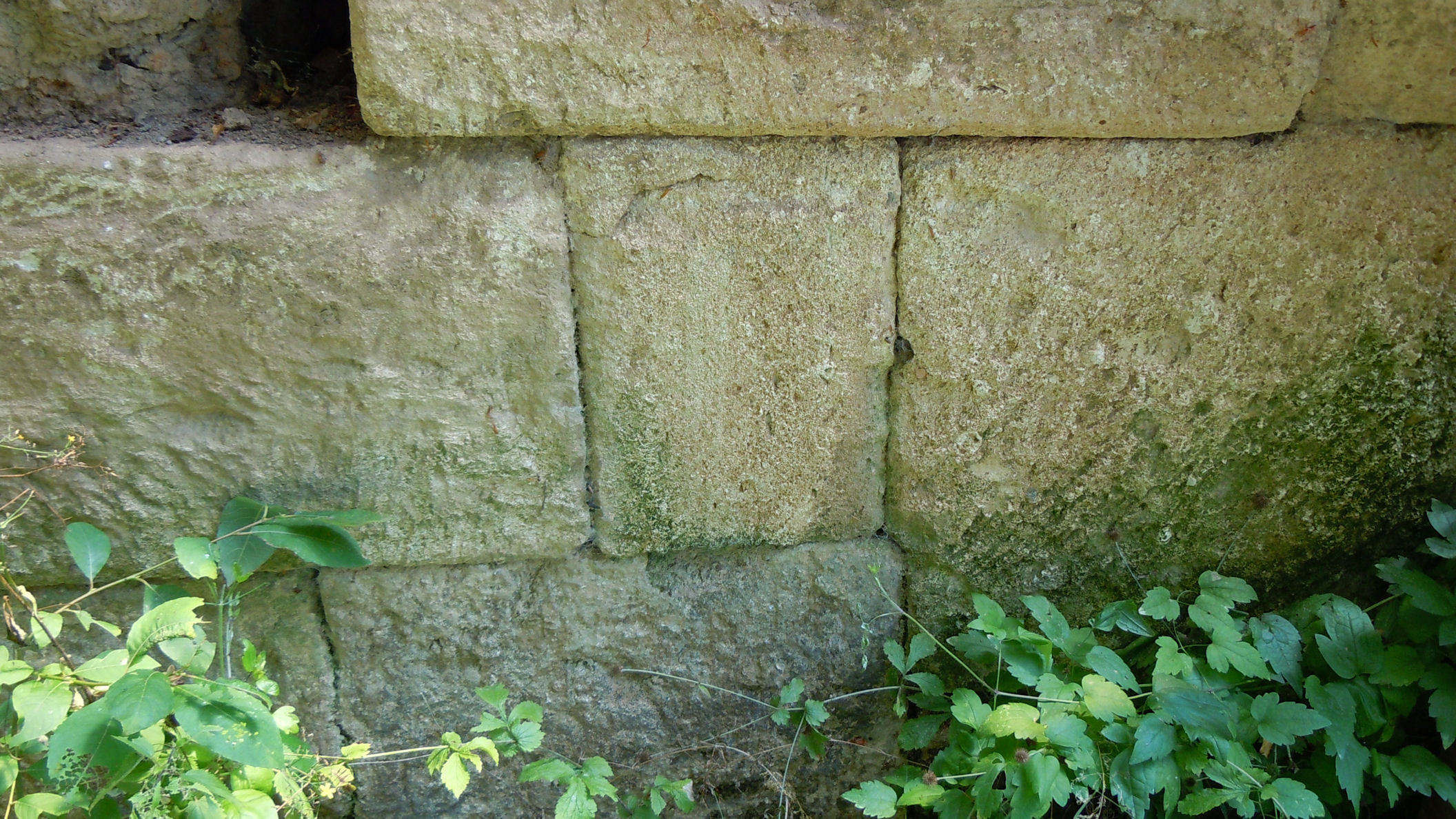
Dacian fortress of Tilișca, Romania

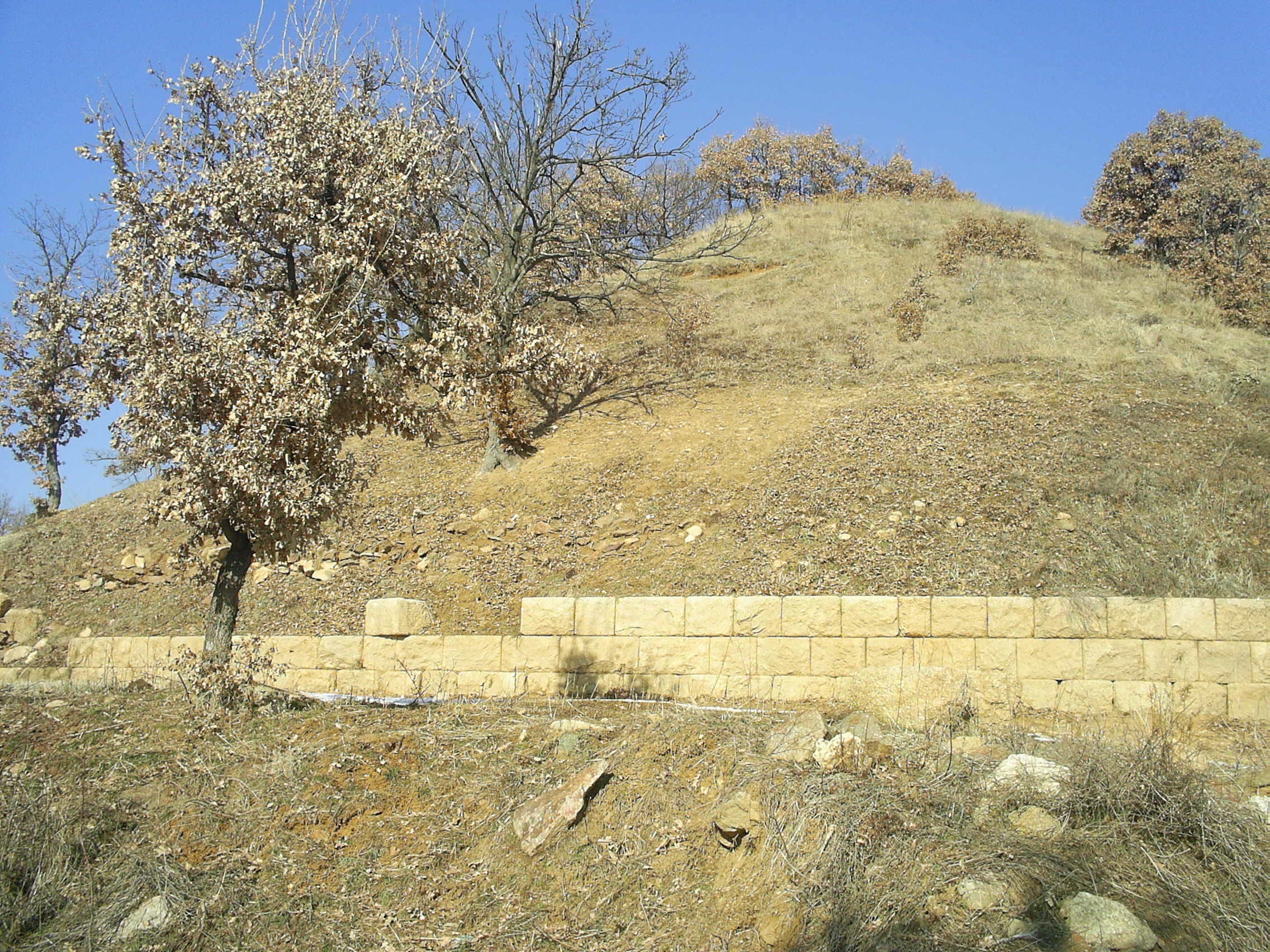
Wall of Thracian tomb near Starosel, Bulgaria

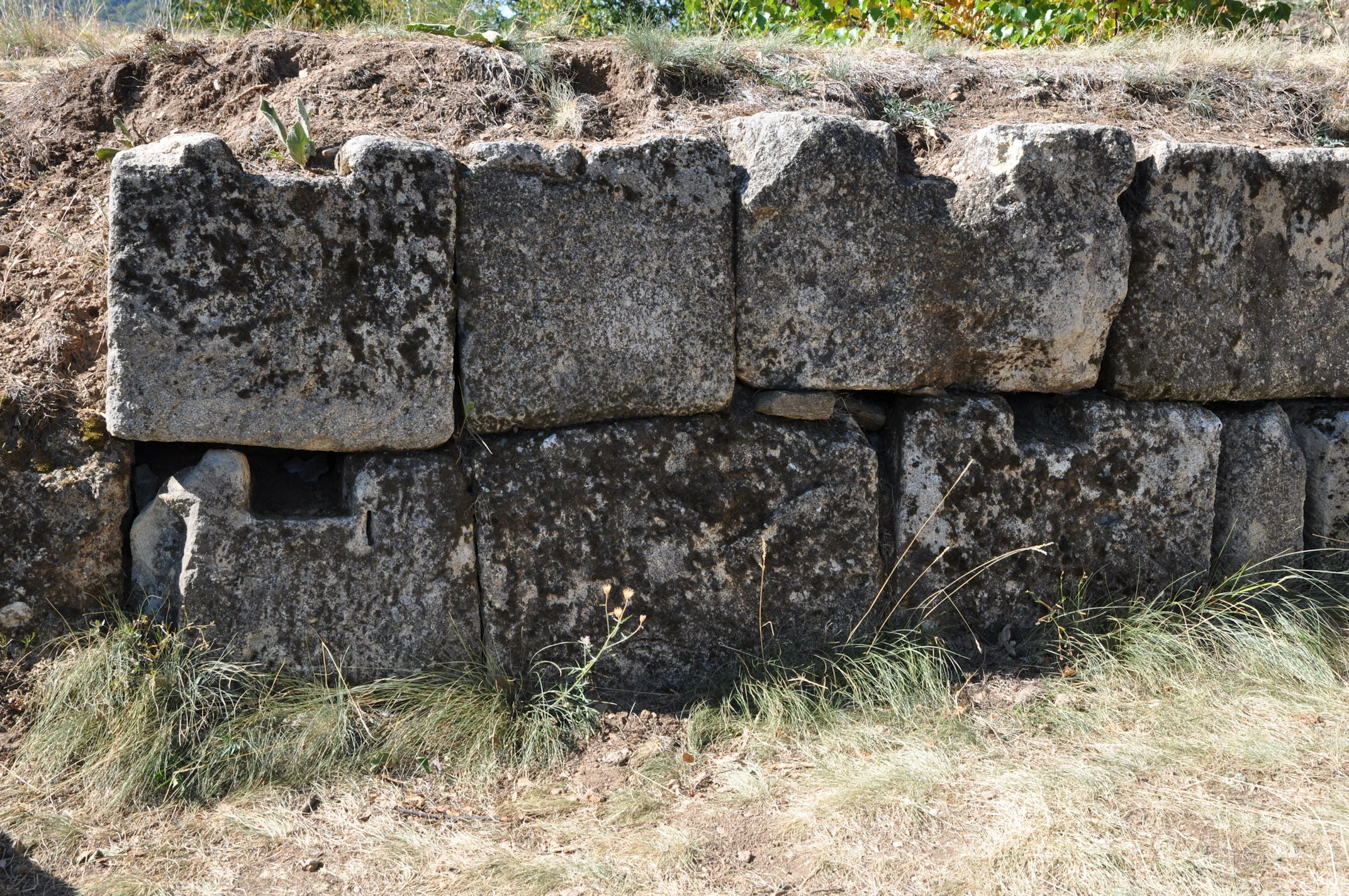
Dacian fortress of Căpâlna, Romania

== See also ==
- Davae
- Hill fort
- Murus gallicus
- Oppidum
- Pfostenschlitzmauer
