= Polondava =

Dacian town

Polondava (Polonda, Ancient Greek: Πολόνδα, Πάλοδα) was a Dacian town, north of Dinogetia.

== See also ==
- Dacian davae
- List of ancient cities in Thrace and Dacia
- Dacia
- Roman Dacia
