= Larissa (Homeric city) =

Larissa (Ancient Greek: Λάρισσα) was an ancient Greek city located in Thrace, located in the region between the river Nestos to the river Hebros. Larissa was located in the borderland between Elis and Achaian Dyme. It remains unlocated and unidentified.

== See also ==
- Greek colonies in Thrace
