= Marcodava (Dacia) =

Dacian fortified settlement

Marcodava (Ancient Greek: Μαρκόδαυα) was a Dacian town, north-west of Apulon.

== See also ==
- Dacian davae
- List of ancient cities in Thrace and Dacia
- Dacia
- Roman Dacia
