= Danedevae =

Dacian town

Danedevae (Danedebai, Ancient Greek: Δανεδέβαι) was a Dacian town.

== See also ==
- Dacian davae
- List of ancient cities in Thrace and Dacia
- Dacia
- Roman Dacia

== Notes ==
- Olteanu, Sorin. "Linguae Thraco-Daco-Moesorum - Toponyms Section". Linguae Thraco-Daco-Moesorum (in Romanian and English). Archived from the original on 16 July 2011.
