= Heraeum (Thrace) =

Coordinates: 41°01′26″N 27°44′31″E

Heraeum or Heraion (Ancient Greek: Ἥραιον), also known as Heraion Teichos (Ἡραῖον τεῖχος), was a Greek city in ancient Thrace, located on the Propontis, a little to the east of Bisanthe. The city was a Samian colony and founded around 600 BC. In some of the Itineraries, the place is called Hiereum or Ereon.

Herodotus, Demosthenes, Harpokration, Stephanus of Byzantium and Suda mention the city.

In 352 BCE Phillip II besieged the city. Athens decided to send a fleet of forty triremes and to levy sixty talents in order to help the city, but the fleet never set sail. Only later a much smaller fleet of ten ships and money of five talents were sent.

Its site is near Aytepe, in Turkey.

== See also ==
- Greek colonies in Thrace
