= Sirra =

Sirra (Ancient Greek: Σίρρα) or (Ancient Greek: Σέρραι) was an ancient Greek polis (after the 4th century BC) located in Thrace, in the region between the river Strymon and the river Nestos. The city ethnic name was (Ancient Greek: Σειραίος) or (Ancient Greek: Σιρραίος) and its territory was called (Ancient Greek: Σειραίκη γή). Sirra was located in the territory of the Odomantes.

It was founded by Paeonians, expanded by Macedonian kings with immigrants and extended to compromise a vast territory with its Komai. Sirra had participated in a local Pentapolis and perhaps in the earlier sympoliteia. It was the northern limit along with Daneiros of the territory granted to another polis, Philippi by Philip II. Sirra's name has remained relatively unchanged since antiquity, in Serres, Serrai. Sirra was located inland.

The precise location and positive of Ancient Sirra is on the Koulas hill north of the modern city with sparse remains. An improbable identification of Ancient Sirra occurred in the case of (Ancient Greek: Σίρις της Παιονίας).

== See also ==
- Greek colonies in Thrace
