= Bergepolis =

Coordinates: 41°03′27″N 25°00′49″E

Bergepolis (Ancient Greek: Βεργέπολις) was a Greek town located in ancient Thrace, in the region between the river Nestos to the river Hebros. It was founded by colonists from Abdera. Bergepolis was an urban center dependent on Abdera. Bergepolis survived in the Roman times.

Its site is located 9 miles (14 km) southeast of modern Xanthi.

== See also ==
- Greek colonies in Thrace
