= Zeugma (Dacia) =

Human settlement in Dacia

Zeugma (Ancient Greek: Ζεῦγμα) was a Dacian town mentioned by Ptolemy.

== See also ==
- Dacian davae
- List of ancient cities in Thrace and Dacia
