= Nentidava =

Dacian fortified settlement

Nentidava (Netindava, Nentidaua, Netindaua Ancient Greek: Νεντίδαυα, Νετίνδαυα) was a Dacian town mentioned by Ptolemy.

== See also ==
- Dacian davae
- List of ancient cities in Thrace and Dacia
- Dacia
- Roman Dacia
