= Acontisma =

Ancient settlement in Macedon

Coordinates: 40°57′58″N 24°31′41″E

Acontisma or Akontisma (Ancient Greek: Ἀκόντισμα), also called Hercontroma or Herkontroma, was a settlement in ancient Macedon near the border of Thrace on the coast and on the Via Egnatia, 8 or 9 miles (13 to 15 km) eastward of Neapolis (modern Kavala), on a pass of the same name. Its site has been identified with remains about 2 miles (3 km) east of Nea Karvali.

An account describing the political consolidation of ancient Macedon identified Acontisma as an outpost located at the easternmost limit of the Macedonian territory. During the Roman times, Acontisma was also the eastern boundary of the province of Macedonia. This settlement, which was some sources described as a mountain pass and a border passage, was included in one of Trajan's inscription citing road repairs.
