= Daminon Teichos =

Greek city in ancient Thrace

Daminon Teichos (Ancient Greek: Δαμινόν τεῖχος), also Daunium or Daunion (Δαύνιον), was a Greek city in ancient Thrace, located in the region of the Propontis.

It is cited in the Periplus of Pseudo-Scylax in its recitation of the towns of the area, appearing between Perinthus and Selymbria. It was a member of the Delian League and is cited on Athenian tribute registries between 454/3 and 418/7 BCE.

Its site is not located exactly, but it has been suggested that the area is located in the current Turkish coast near Gümüsyaka (Silivri district).

== See also ==
- Greek colonies in Thrace
