= Deris (Thrace) =

Ancient city of Thrace

Coordinates: 40°39′28″N 26°48′32″E

Deris (Ancient Greek: Δέρις or Δερίς) was an ancient Greek city located in ancient Thrace, located in the region of the Thracian Chersonesus. It is cited in the Periplus of Pseudo-Scylax, which mentions that it was an Emporium and was located between the river Melas, which flows into the Gulf of Melas, and Cardia. It has been suggested that it would be the same as a city called Deiraeus or Deiraios (Δειραῖος), cited by Stephanus of Byzantium and appearing in an inscription according to which it belonged to the Delian League.

Its site is tentatively located near Kocaçesme, Turkey.

== See also ==
- Greek colonies in Thrace
