= Dacian fortress of Merești =

- Location within Romania
- 46.23°N 25.45°E
- Location: Dâmbul Pipaşilor, Merești, Harghita, Romania

Site notes
- Condition: Ruined

Monument istoric
- Reference no.: HR-I-s-B-12679

It was a Dacian fortified town.
