= Dacian fortress of Bocșa =

- Location within Romania
- 45.383041°N 21.718725°E
- Location: Gruniul Cetății (Smida Veche), Bocșa, Caraș-Severin, Romania

Site notes
- Condition: Ruined

Monument istoric
- Reference no.: CS-I-s-B-10788

It was a Dacian fortified town.
