= Dacian fortress of Timișu de Jos =

Dacian fortresses in Brașov County

- Bunloc fortress
- Location within Romania
- 45.5923°N 25.6593°E
- Location: Bunloc, Timișu de Jos, Brașov, Romania

Site notes
- Condition: Ruined

It was a Dacian fortified town.
