= Dacian fortress of Roadeș =

- Location within Romania
- 46.1281°N 25.1083°E
- Location: Dealul Cetăţii, Roadeș, Brașov, Romania

Site notes
- Condition: Ruined

Monument istoric
- Reference no.: BV-I-s-B-11285

It was a Dacian fortified town.
