= Dacian fortress of Viișoara Moșneni =

- Location within Romania
- 44.2427°N 24.1418°E
- Location: La cetate, Viișoara Moșneni, Dolj, Romania

Site notes
- Condition: Ruined

The Dacian fortress of Viişoara Moşneni was a Dacian fortified town.
