= Dacian fortress of Uroi =

Dacian Fort

- Location within Romania
- 45.860838°N 23.042877°E
- Location: Măgura Uroiului, Uroi, Hunedoara, Romania

Site notes
- Elevation: 370 m (1,210 ft)
- Condition: Ruined

It was a Dacian fortified town.
