= Dacian fortress of Turia =

- Location within Romania
- 46.04°N 26.06°E
- Location: Turia, Covasna, Romania

Site notes
- Condition: Ruined

Monument istoric
- Reference no.: CV-I-s-A-13081

It was a Dacian fortified town.
