= Dacian fortress of Botfei =

- Dacian fortress of Hășmaș; "Cetățeaua înaltă" (in Romanian)
- Location within Romania
- 46.586864°N 22.125190°E
- Location: Cetățeaua înaltă, Botfei, Arad, Romania

History
- Built: 1st century BC
- Abandoned: 1st century AD

Site notes
- Elevation: 505 m (1,657 ft)
- Condition: Ruined

It was a Dacian fortified town.
