= Dacian fortress of Dalboșeț =

- Location within Romania
- 44.846°N 21.392°E
- Location: Grădişte, Dalboșeț, Caraș-Severin, Romania

Site notes
- Condition: Ruined

Monument istoric
- Reference no.: CS-I-s-B-10820

The Dacian fortress of Dalboșeț is a former Dacian fortified town in modern day Dalboșeț, Romania.
