= Dacian fortress of Divici =

- Location within Romania
- 44.78201°N 21.48041°E
- Location: Grad, Socol, Caraș-Severin, Romania

Site notes
- Elevation: 110 m (360 ft)
- Condition: Ruined

Monument istoric
- Reference no.: CS-I-s-A-10821

The Dacian fortress of Divici was a Dacian fortified town.
