= Dacian fortress of Marca =

- Location within Romania
- 47.21°N 22.55°E
- Location: Cetate, Marca, Sălaj, Romania

Site notes
- Condition: Ruined

The Dacian fortress of Marca was a Dacian fortified town.
