= Dacian fortress of Grădiștea de Munte =

Dacian fortress of Grădiştea de Munte
- Location within Romania
- 45.63°N 23.20°E
- Location: Dealul Anineşului, Grădiştea de Munte, Hunedoara, Romania

Site notes
- Condition: Ruined

It was a Dacian fortified town.
