= Dacian fortress of Băile Tușnad =

- Location within Romania
- 46.146511°N 25.872104°E
- Location: Piscul cetății, Băile Tușnad, Harghita, Romania

Site notes
- Condition: Ruined

Monument istoric
- Reference no.: HR-I-s-B-12652

It was a Dacian fortified town.
