= Dacian fortress of Petroșani =

- Location within Romania
- 45.412°N 23.372°E
- Location: Druglu Mare, Petroșani, Hunedoara, Romania

Site notes
- Condition: Ruined

It was a Dacian fortified town.
