= Dacian fortress of Clopotiva =

- Location within Romania
- 45.477°N 22.805°E
- Location: Vârful Pietrei, Clopotiva, Hunedoara, Romania

Site notes
- Condition: Ruined

It was a Dacian fortified town.
