= Dacian fortress of Satu Nou =

- Location within Romania
- 44.186°N 27.586°E
- Location: Vadul vacilor, Socol, Constanța, Romania

Site notes
- Condition: Ruined

It was a Geto-Dacian fortified town.
