= Dacian fortress of Dumitrița =

- Location within Romania
- 47.07527°N 24.64248°E
- Location: Dealul Cetății, Dumitrița, Bistrița-Năsăud, Romania

Site notes
- Condition: Ruined

Monument istoric
- Reference no.: BN-I-s-A-01342

It was a Dacian fortified town.
