= Dacian fortress of Socol =

Town

- Location within Romania
- 44.846°N 21.392°E
- Location: Palanacki Breg, Socol, Caraș-Severin, Romania

Site notes
- Elevation: 110 m (360 ft)
- Condition: Ruined

Monument istoric
- Reference no.: CS-I-s-B-10875

It was a Dacian fortified town.
