= Tirista =

Scientific classification
- Kingdom: Animalia
- Phylum: Arthropoda
- Class: Insecta
- Order: Lepidoptera
- Family: Sesiidae
- Tribe: Paranthrenini
- Genus: Tirista; Walker, [1865]

Species
- See text

Genus of moths

Tirista is a genus of moths in the family Sesiidae.

== Species ==
- Tirista argentifrons Walker, [1865]
- Tirista praxila Druce, 1896
