= Dacian fortress of Telița =

- Location within Romania
- 45.1742°N 28.5407°E
- Location: Edirlen, Telița, Tulcea, Romania

History
- Built: 4th or 3rd century BC

Site notes
- Excavation dates: 2011
- Archaeologists: Valeriu Sârbu
- Condition: Ruined

It was a Dacian fortified town.
