= Dacian fortress of Popești (Călărași) =

- Location within Romania
- 44.192°N 26.486°E
- Location: Pădurea Cioarin, Popești, Călărași, Romania

Site notes
- Condition: Ruined

Monument istoric
- Reference no.: CL-I-m-A-14568

It was a Dacian fortified town.
