= Dacian fortress of Iedera de Jos =

- Location within Romania
- 45.0501°N 25.6749°E
- Location: Cetățuia / Dealul Cetățuia, Iedera de Jos, Dâmbovița, Romania

Site notes
- Condition: Ruined

The Dacian fortress of Iedera de Jos is located within the county of Dâmbovița, Romania.
