= Dacian fortress of Zemplín =

- Location within Slovakia
- 48.44°N 21.81°E
- Location: Zemplín, Slovakia

Site notes
- Elevation: 220 m (720 ft)
- Condition: Ruined

It was a Dacian fortified town. The Dacian name is Susudava.
