= Dacian fortress of Cioclovina =

Dacian fortified town in Romania

- Location within Romania
- 45.602°N 23.123°E
- Location: Ponorici, Dealului Mesteacănului, Cioclovina, Hunedoara, Romania

Site notes
- Condition: Ruined

It was a Dacian fortified town.
