= Dacian fortress of Moșna =

- Location within Romania
- 46.92°N 27.95°E
- Location: Cetăţuia, Moşna, Iași, Romania

Site notes
- Condition: Ruined

Monument istoric
- Reference no.: IS-I-s-B-03619

It was a Dacian fortified town, built in the 1st centuries B.C. and A.D.. It showcases a combination of religious and military architecture, stemming from the late European Iron Age and the classical world. It was eventually conquered by the Romans at the start of the 2nd century A.D..
