= Dacian fortress of Ardan =

- Location within Romania
- 47.02°N 24.66°E
- Location: Ardan, Bistrița-Năsăud, Romania

Site notes
- Condition: Ruined

Monument istoric
- Reference no.: BN-I-m-A-01285.02

The Dacian fortress of Ardan was a Dacian fortified town.
