= Dacian fortress of Cârlomănești =

- Location within Romania
- 45.22°N 26.68°E
- Location: Cârlomăneşti, Buzău, Romania

Site notes
- Condition: Ruined

Monument istoric
- Reference no.: BZ-I-m-A-02212.01

It was a Dacian fortified town.
