= Dacian fortress of Jigodin =

- Location within Romania
- 46.34°N 25.80°E
- Location: Câmpul Morii, Jigodin, Harghita, Romania

Site notes
- Condition: Ruined

Monument istoric
- Reference no.: HR-I-s-B-12641

It was a Dacian fortified town.
