= Dacian fortress of Beidaud =

- Location within Romania
- 44.7099°N 28.5508°E
- Location: Beidaud, Tulcea, Romania

Site notes
- Condition: Ruined

Monument istoric
- Reference no.: TL-I-s-A-05742

It was a Dacian fortified town.
