= Dacian fortress of Pinticu =

Fortified town

- Location within Romania
- 46.9334°N 24.5568°E
- Location: Cetăţuia, Pinticu, Bistrița-Năsăud, Romania

Site notes
- Condition: Ruined

Monument istoric
- Reference no.: BN-I-s-B-01379

It was a Dacian fortified town.
