= Dacian fortress of Crivești =

- Location within Romania
- 47.3033°N 26.7738°E
- Location: La cetate, Crivești, Iași, Romania

Site notes
- Condition: Ruined

Monument istoric
- Reference no.: IS-I-s-B-03568

It was a Dacian fortified town.
