= Dacian fortress of Poiana cu Cetate =

- Location within Romania
- 46.976°N 27.530°E
- Location: La cetate, Dealul Cetății, Poiana cu Cetate, Iași, Romania

Site notes
- Condition: Ruined

Monument istoric
- Reference no.: IS-I-s-B-03636

It was a Dacian fortified town.
