= Dacian fortress of Sprâncenata =

- Location within Romania
- 44.05°N 24.64°E
- Location: Sprâncenata, Olt, Romania

Site notes
- Condition: Ruined

Monument istoric
- Reference no.: OT-I-s-B-08507

It was a Dacian fortified town.
