= Dacian fortress of Satu Mare (Harghita) =

- Location within Romania
- 46.34°N 25.37°E
- Location: Satu Mare, Harghita, Romania

Site notes
- Condition: Ruined

Monument istoric
- Reference no.: HR-I-s-B-12704

It was a Dacian fortified town.
