= Dacian fortress of Olteni =

- Location within Romania
- 45.97°N 25.84°E
- Location: Cetatea fetei, Olteni, Covasna, Romania

Site notes
- Condition: Ruined

Monument istoric
- Reference no.: CV-I-s-A-13072

It was a Dacian fortified town.
