= Dacian fortress of Rușor =

- Location within Romania
- 45.526°N 23.016°E
- Location: La vămi, Rușor, Hunedoara, Romania

Site notes
- Condition: Ruined

It was a Dacian fortified town.
