= Dacian fortress of Radovanu – Gorgana I =

Dacian fortress of Radovanu - Gorgana I
- Location within Romania
- 44.192°N 26.486°E
- Location: Radovanu, Călărași, Romania

Site notes
- Condition: Ruined

Monument istoric
- Reference no.: CL-I-s-B-14572

It was a Dacian fortified town.
