= Dacian fortress of Radovanu – Jidovescu =

Dacian fortified town

Dacian fortress of Radovanu - Jidovescu
- Location within Romania
- 44.213°N 26.456°E
- Location: Jidovescu, Radovanu, Călărași, Romania

Site notes
- Condition: Ruined

Monument istoric
- Reference no.: CL-I-s-B-14574

The Dacian fortress of Radovanu – Jidovescu was a Dacian fortified town.
