= Dacian fortress of Cetățeni =

Dacian fortified town in Romania

- Location within Romania
- 45.19°N 25.21°E
- Location: Grigoroaia, Cetățeni, Argeș, Romania

Site notes
- Condition: Ruined

Monument istoric
- Reference no.: AG-I-s-B-13360

It was a Dacian fortified town.
