= Dacian fortress of Sacalasău =

- Location within Romania
- 47.1900°N 22.2944°E
- Location: Dealul cu bani, Sacalasău, Bihor, Romania

Site notes
- Elevation: 231 m (758 ft)
- Condition: Ruined

Monument istoric
- Reference no.: BH-I-s-B-00994

It was a Dacian fortified town.
