= Dacian fortress of Feleac =

Dacian fortified town in Romania

- Location within Romania
- 47.0697°N 24.2249°E
- Location: Cetate, Feleac, Bistrița-Năsăud, Romania

Site notes
- Condition: Ruined

Monument istoric
- Reference no.: BN-I-s-B-01349

It was a Dacian fortified town.
