= Dacian fortress of Odorheiu Secuiesc =

- Location within Romania
- 46.30°N 25.30°E
- Location: Cicer, Odorheiu Secuiesc, Harghita, Romania

Site notes
- Condition: Ruined

Monument istoric
- Reference no.: HR-I-m-A-12693.02

It was a Dacian fortified town.
