= Dacian fortress of Rovinari =

- Dacian fortress of Vârț
- Location within Romania
- 44.9439°N 23.1212°E
- Location: Cioaca cu bani, Rovinari, Gorj, Romania

History
- Built: 1st century BC
- Abandoned: 1st century AD

Site notes
- Archaeologists: Dumitru Berciu; Constantin S. Nicolăescu-Plopșor
- Condition: Ruined

It was a Dacian fortified town.
