= Dacian fortress of Ocolișu Mic =

Dacian town

- Location within Romania
- 45.709°N 23.130°E
- Location: La vămi, Ocolişu Mic, Hunedoara, Romania

Site notes
- Elevation: 480 m (1,570 ft)
- Condition: Ruined

It was a Dacian fortified town.
