= Dacian fortress of Eliseni =

- Location within Romania
- 46.290°N 24.935°E
- Location: Cetate, Dealul paznicului, Eliseni, Harghita, Romania

Site notes
- Condition: Ruined

It was a Dacian fortified town in modern day Romania.
