= Dacian fortress of Liubcova =

Dacian fortified town in Romania

- Location within Romania
- 44.656°N 21.922°E
- Location: Stenca Liubcovei, Liubcova, Caraș-Severin, Romania

Site notes
- Condition: Ruined

Monument istoric
- Reference no.: CS-I-s-B-10848

It was a Dacian fortified town in Romania.
