= Zidava =

Dacian town in Alba County, Romania

- Location within Romania
- 46.0776°N 23.6338°E
- Location: Dealul Gruieţ, Drâmbar, Alba, Romania

Site notes
- Condition: Ruined

Monument istoric
- Reference no.: AB-I-s-B-00034

Zidava was a Dacian fortified town in present-day Alba County, in the Transylvanian region of Romania.
