= Draviskos =

Village in Central Macedonia, Greece

Coordinates: 40°55′25″N 23°52′15″E

Draviskos (Greek: Δραβήσκος) is a village in Serres regional unit, located 45 km southeast of the city of Serres. Since 2011 it is a municipal unit of the Municipality of Nea Zichni. Until 1926 it was named "Zdravik".

== History ==
=== Antiquity ===
Just to the west of the present village, at the "Frangala" site, remains have been found (architectural members and inscriptions) of an ancient city, which is identified with the ancient Thracian city of Drabeskos in Edonis. The mention of the city by Strabo and Appian testifies to its existence in the Roman antiquity, since it was probably downgraded to a simple settlement (kome) depended administratively from the nearby Amphipolis.

== Sources ==
- Fotić, Aleksandar (2019). "Coping with Extortion on a Local Level: The Case of Hilandarʹs Metochion in Zdravikion (Draviskos, Strymon Region) in the Sixteenth Century" (PDF). Balcanica. 50: 73–83. Archived from the original (PDF) on 2021-12-12.
