= Dacian fortress of Stoina =

Dacian fortified town

- Dacian fortress of Păișani
- Location within Romania
- 44.6701°N 23.6179°E
- Location: La cetate, Stoina, Gorj, Romania

Site notes
- Condition: Ruined

Monument istoric
- Reference no.: GJ-I-s-B-09136

It was a Dacian fortified town.
