= Battle of Tapae =

Battle of Tapae may refer to:

- First Battle of Tapae, between Domitian and Dacians in 86/87 AD won by the Dacians
- Second Battle of Tapae, between Decebal and Lucius Tettius Julianus in 88 AD won by the Romans
- Third Battle of Tapae, between Trajan and Decebal in 101 AD won by the Romans
