= Sinitovo =

Village in Pazardzhik Province, Bulgaria

Coordinates: 42°09′N 24°22′E

Sinitovo Синитово
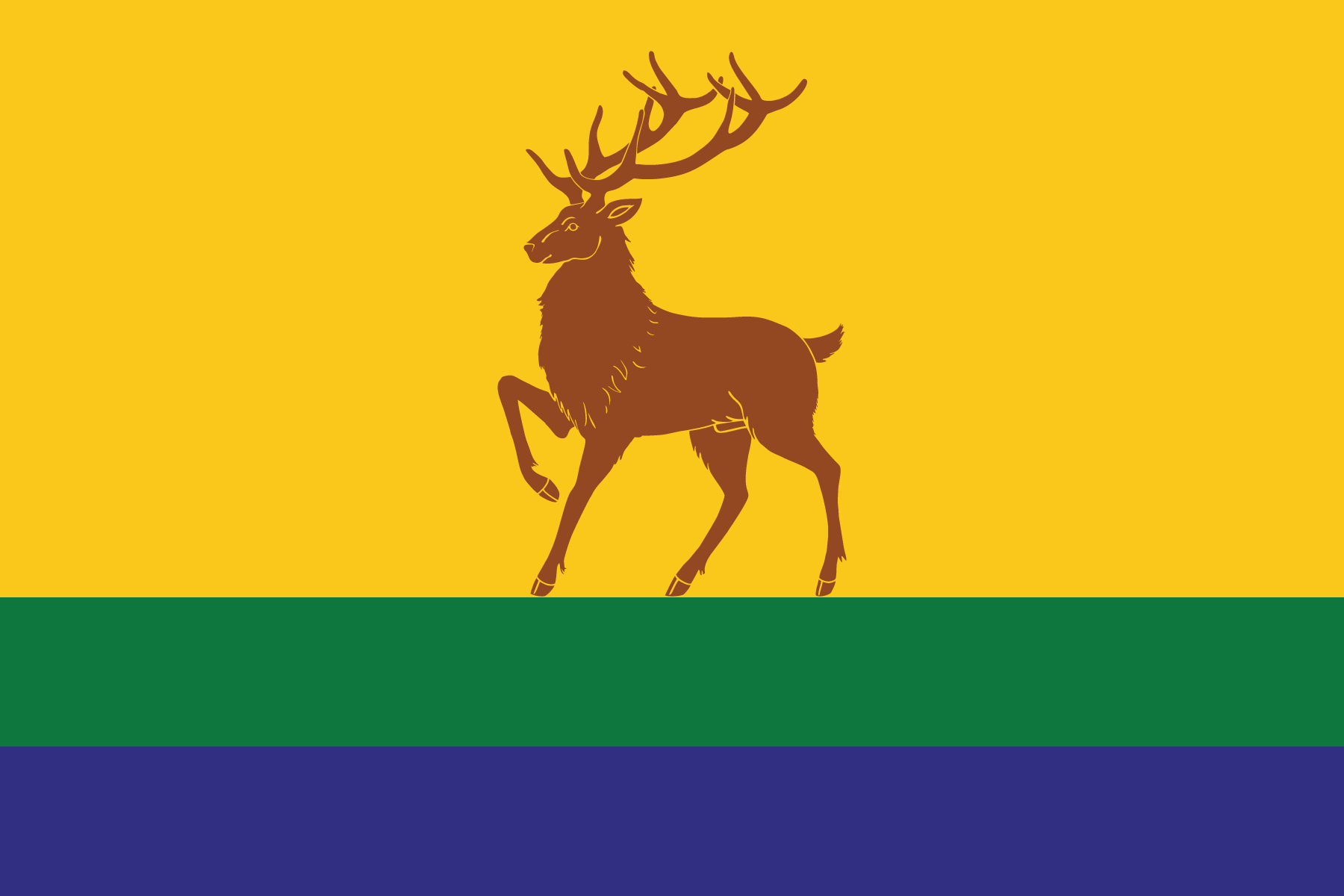
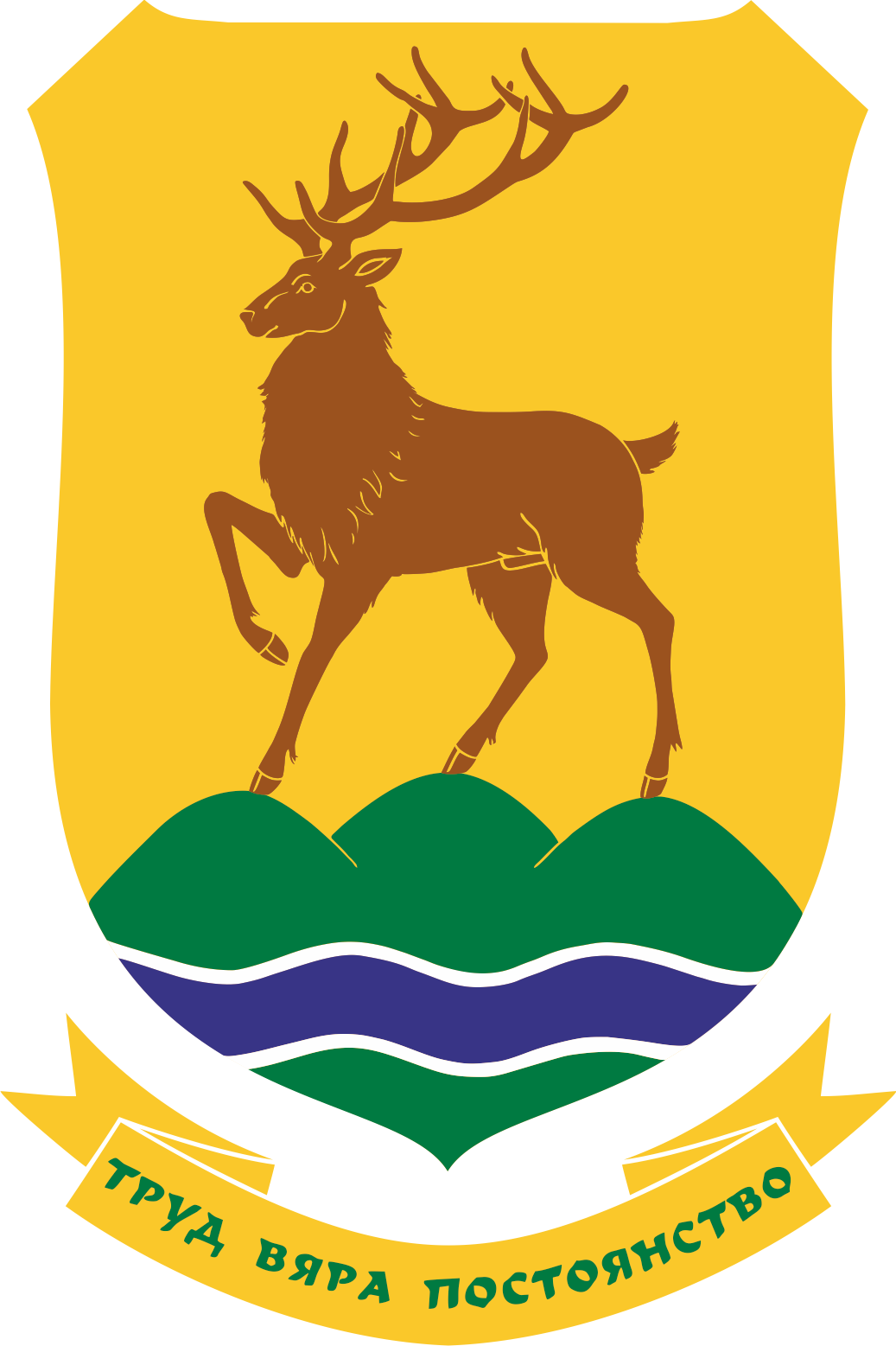
- Flag Coat of arms
- Motto: Work, faith, perseverance
- Interactive map of Sinitovo

Sinitovo (Bulgarian: Синитово) is a village in central Bulgaria. It is located 5 km. east of Pazardzhik. As of 2022 the population was 1768. It is located at an altitude of 200 metres (660 ft) in a fertile agricultural region near the Maritsa river. The main products grown in the area include wheat, maize, peppers, while the most widespread spread domestic animal is the sheep.

The village is mentioned in Ottoman documents from 1576, 1607, 1696. There is a kindergarten, school, chitalishte and a church "Sv. Georgi" from 1884. Many Roman artifacts are found in the vicinity of the village, including marble statues and a bust of a Roman Emperor. There are ruins of Roman fortress erected by Justinian and the important Thracian settlement Bessapara, the Βεσούπαρον of Procopius.

== Honours ==
Sinitevo Gap in Graham Land, Antarctica is named after the village.
