= Dacian fortress of Moinești =

Fortified town

- Location within Romania
- 46.479°N 26.483°E
- Location: Moinești, Bacău County, Romania

Site notes
- Condition: Ruined

Monument istoric
- Reference no.: BC-I-s-A-00732

Moinești was a Dacian fortified town.
