= Dacian fortress of Covasna =

- Cetatea Zânelor, Fairies Fortress
- Location within Romania
- 45.827193°N 26.222660°E
- Location: Dealul Florilor, Covasna, Covasna County, Romania

Site notes
- Excavation dates: 1942 – 1943; 1949; 1998
- Archaeologists: Al. Ferenczi; Constantin Daicoviciu; V. Sârbu; V. Crișan
- Condition: Ruined

Monument istoric
- Reference no.: CV-I-s-A-13058

The Dacian fortress of Covasna served as a Dacian fortified town and is rated to have been built in the 1st century BC. It sits on a mountain in the Brețcu-Oituz Mountains above the town of Covasna, which is 227 km from the capital of Bucharest. The fortress is also known by the name of the Fairies Fortress, sitting atop of the Valley of Fairies.

== Construction ==
The fortress consisted of a number of terraced fortifications sitting at an altitude of about 900 m above sea level with a command of the areas around south-east Transylvania, south Moldavia and east Wallachia. In all the fortress covered an area of 10,000 m^{2}. A number of defensive buildings were built as well as religious sites and the terraces blocked and hampered advancing armies as they were bolstered by 1.5 m to 2 m high and 2m to 2.5 m thick solid sandstone slab walls.

The first terrace was 3,000 m^{2} while the second was 3,700 m^{2} and the third 150 m^{2}. Each was fortified by walls. Excavations lead to the possibility of other terraces further down.

The main acropolis was situated at the base of the plateau was a 700 m^{2} circular solid stone building.

== Conquering ==
The fortress is assumed to have been a Dacian haven for over two centuries until the Roman–Dacian wars of the 2nd Century AD.

== Excavation ==
Three major excavation works have happened here through the last century:

- Al. Ferenczi (1942 – 1943)
- C. Daicoviciu (1949)
- V. Sârbu and V. Crisan, 1998
