= Dacian fortress of Boroșneu Mic =

- Location within Romania
- 45.765°N 25.993°E
- Location: Măgura rotundă, Boroşneu Mic, Covasna, Romania

Site notes
- Condition: Ruined

Monument istoric
- Reference no.: CV-I-s-A-13048

It was a Dacian fortified town.
