= Dacian fortress of Cugir =

- Location within Romania
- 45.8276°N 23.3655°E
- Location: Cetăţuia, Cugir, Alba, Romania

Site notes
- Elevation: 480 m (1,570 ft)
- Condition: Ruined

Monument istoric
- Reference no.: AB-I-s-B-00030

It was a Dacian fortified town.
