= Dacian fortress of Mala Kopania =

- Location within Ukraine
- 48.1675°N 23.1110°E
- Location: Mala Kopania, Berehove Raion, Zakarpattia Oblast, Ukraine

Site notes
- Elevation: 220 m (720 ft)
- Condition: Ruined

The Dacian fortress of Mala Kopania is a ruined Dacian fortified town and hill fort located in the village of Mala Kopania, Berehove Raion, Zakarpattia Oblast, in the westernmost corner of Ukraine.
