= Zikideva =

Early Byzantine town

Zicídeva (Greek: Ζικίδεβα) was an Early Byzantine town, tentatively identified with the late antique settlement excavated on the top of Tsarevets hill, near modern Veliko Tarnovo in northern Bulgaria.

== Bibliography ==
- Curta, Florin (2006). Southeastern Europe in the Middle Ages, 500–1250.
