= Dacian fortress of Aghireșu =

Archaeolgical site in Romania

- Location within Romania
- 46.871°N 23.241°E
- Location: La stoguri, Aghireșu, Cluj, Romania

Site notes
- Condition: Ruined

Monument istoric
- Reference no.: CJ-I-s-B-06935

It was a Dacian fortified settlement located near the present town of Aghireșu, Romania.
