= Dacian fortress of Boșorod =

Dacian fortified town

- Location within Romania
- 45.682°N 23.092°E
- Location: Valea Stupăriei, Boșorod, Hunedoara, Romania

Site notes
- Elevation: 480 m (1,570 ft)
- Condition: Ruined

Boșorod was a Dacian fortified town.
