= Dacian fortress of Coțofenii din Dos =

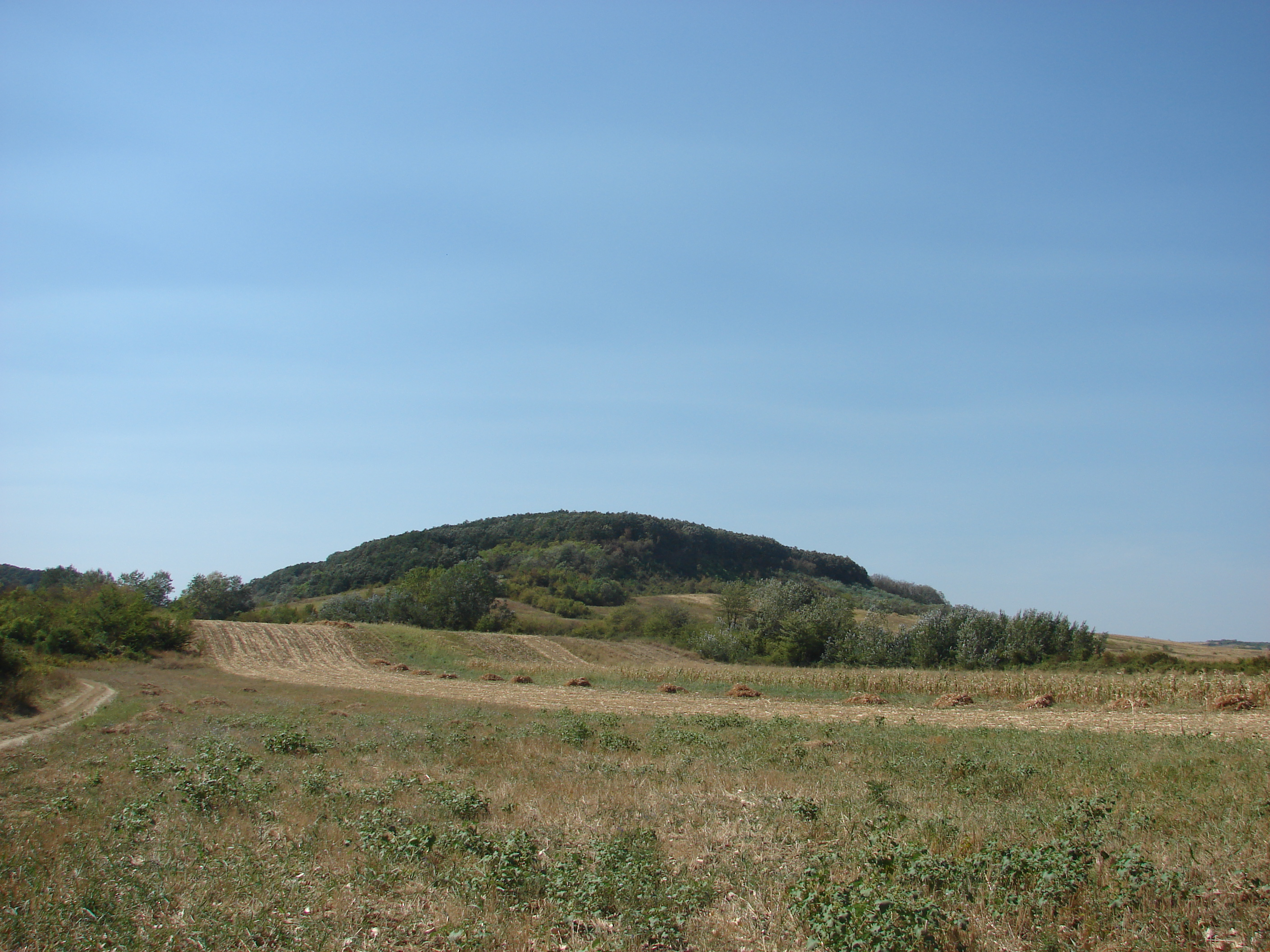

- Location within Romania
- 44.418904°N 23.632406°E
- Location: Dealul Botu Mare, Coțofenii din Dos, Dolj, Romania

History
- Built: 4th or 3rd century BC

Site notes
- Area: 3 ha (7.4 acres) (approx.)
- Excavation dates: 1992
- Archaeologists: N. Conovici; G. Trohani; P. Gherghe; P. Alexandrescu; Gheorghe Gâta; Vlad Vintilă Zirra; Dumitru Berciu

Monument istoric
- Reference no.: DJ-I-s-A-07888

It was a Dacian fortified town.

== Images ==
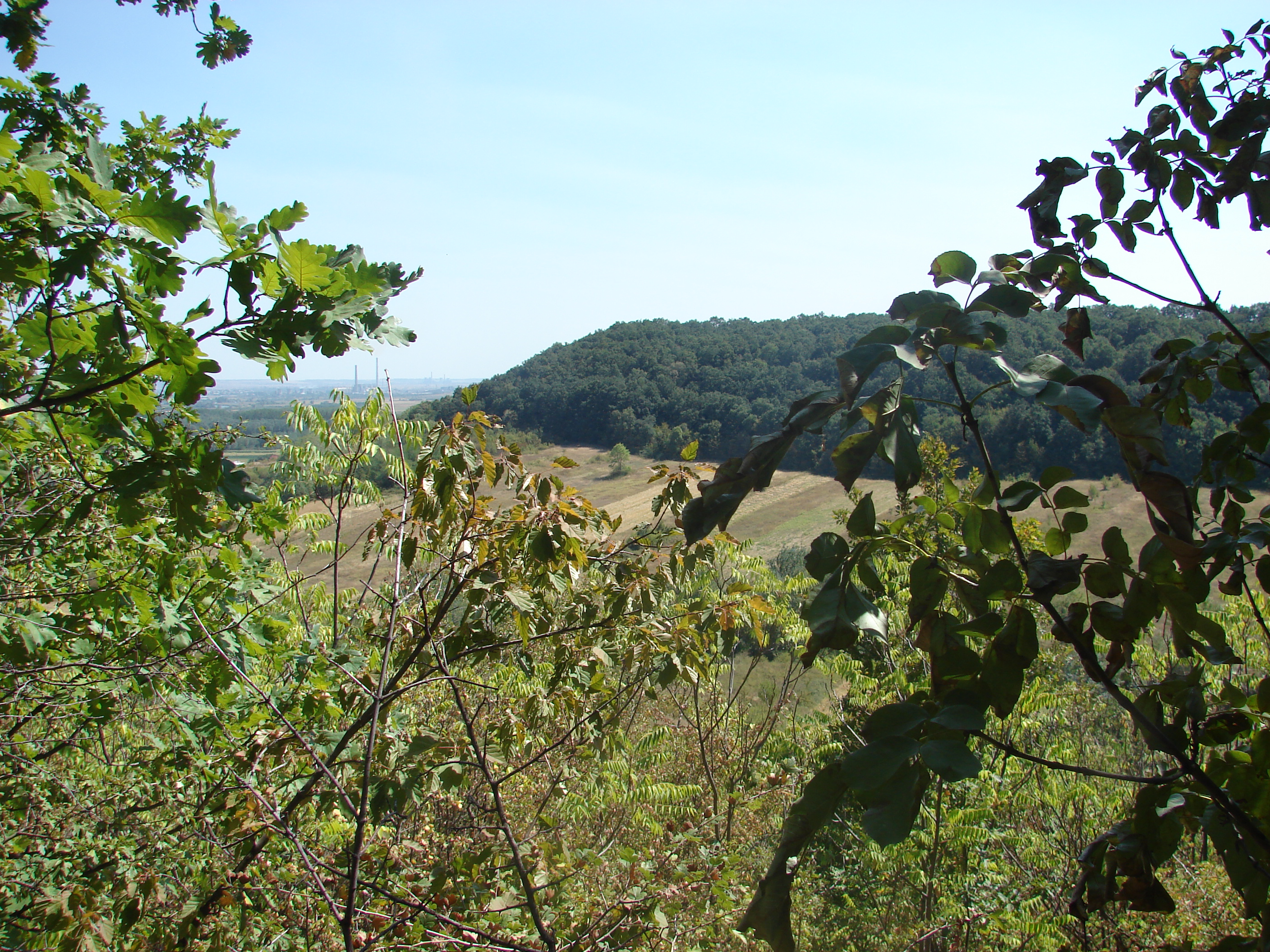
View over Ișalnița from the fortress

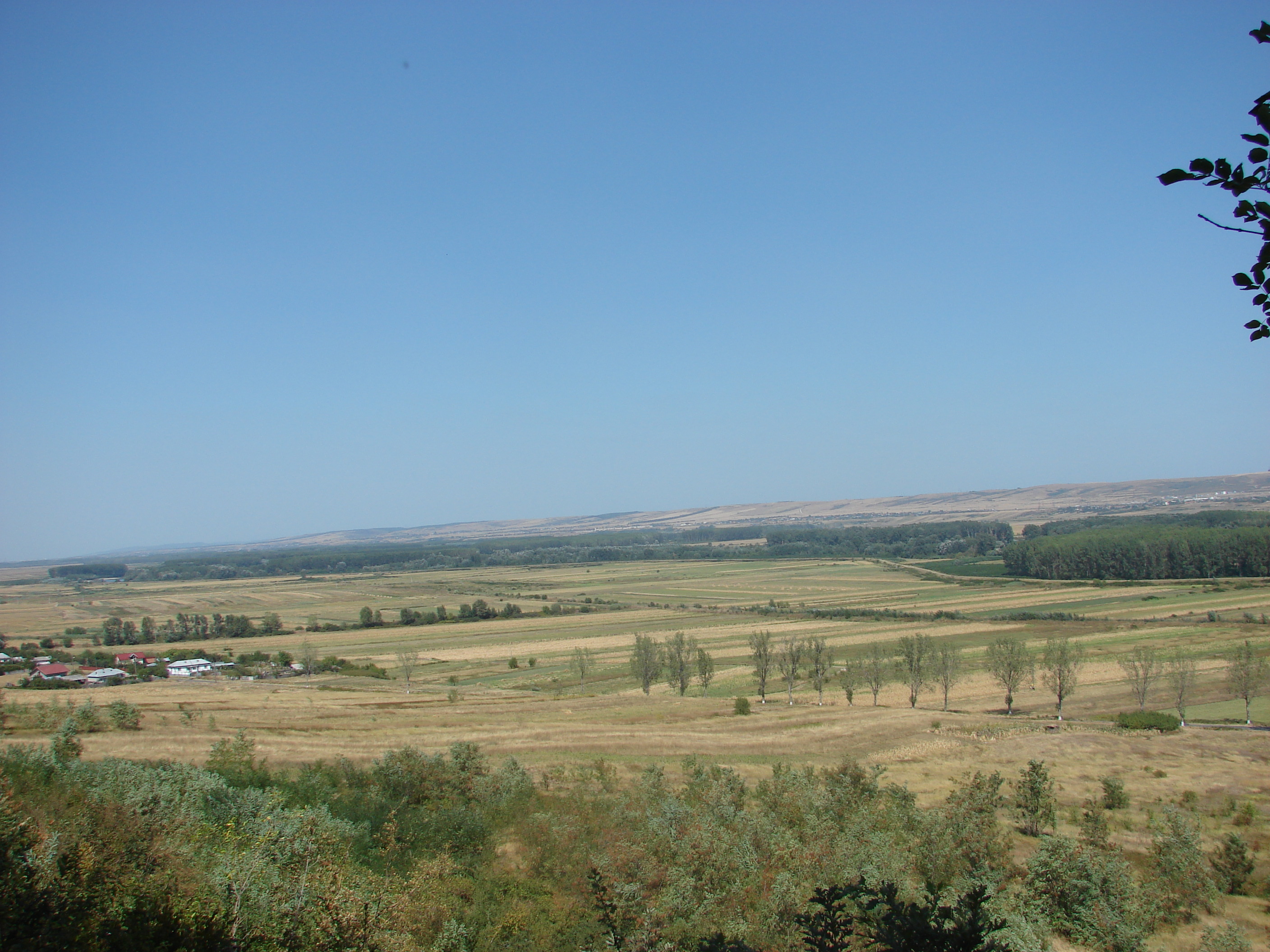
View over Filiași from the fortress

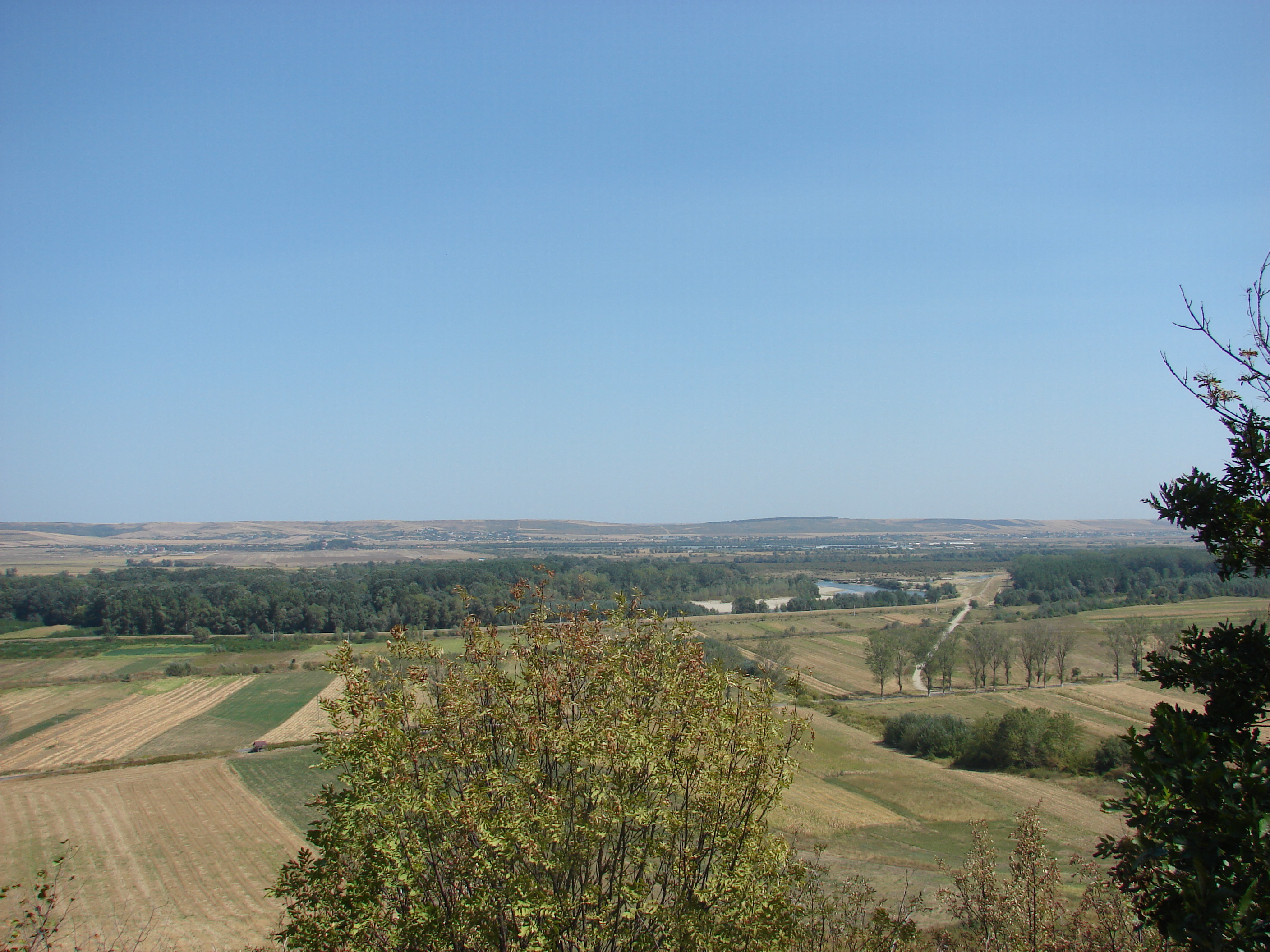
View over Jiu River from the fortress
