= Dacian fortress of Cernat =

- Location within Romania
- 45.97°N 26.00°E
- Location: Vârful ascuţit, Cernat, Covasna, Romania

Site notes
- Condition: Ruined

Monument istoric
- Reference no.: CV-I-m-A-13056.02

It was a Dacian fortified town.
