= Dacian fortress of Ardeu =

- Location within Romania
- 46.0161°N 23.1460°E
- Location: Ardeu, Hunedoara, Romania

Site notes
- Elevation: 395 m (1,296 ft)
- Archaeologists: Dr. Adriana Pescaru; Dr. Iosif Vasile Ferencz; Dr. Cristian Constantin Roman; Dr. Cristian Ioan Popa; Mihai Cristian Căstăian; Cristian Dima
- Condition: Ruined
- Website: ardeu.ro

Monument istoric
- Reference no.: HD-I-m-A-03151.02

It was a Dacian fortified town.
