= Dacian fortress of Șeica Mică =

Dacian fortified town in Romania

- Location within Romania
- 46.05°N 24.12°E
- Location: Cetate, Șeica Mică, Sibiu, Romania

Site notes
- Condition: Ruined

Monument istoric
- Reference no.: SB-I-s-B-11999

It was a Dacian fortified town.
