= Dacian fortress of Racu =

Dacian fortified town

- Dacian fortress of Siculeni, Cetatea Păgânilor
- Location within Romania
- 46.44°N 25.74°E
- Location: Racu, Harghita, Romania

Site notes
- Condition: Ruined

Monument istoric
- Reference no.: HR-I-s-B-12702

It was a Dacian fortified town.
