= Getic fortress of Seimeni =

- Location within Romania
- 44.386°N 28.062°E
- Location: Seimeni, Constanța, Romania

Site notes
- Condition: Ruined

Seimeni was a Getic fortified settlement in what is now Constanța County, Romania.
