= Dacian fortress of Tășad =

Dacian fortified town in Romania

- Location within Romania
- 46.94°N 22.12°E
- Location: Tăşad, Bihor, Romania

Site notes
- Condition: Ruined

Monument istoric
- Reference no.: BH-I-s-B-01021

It was a Dacian fortified town.
