= Orthagoria =

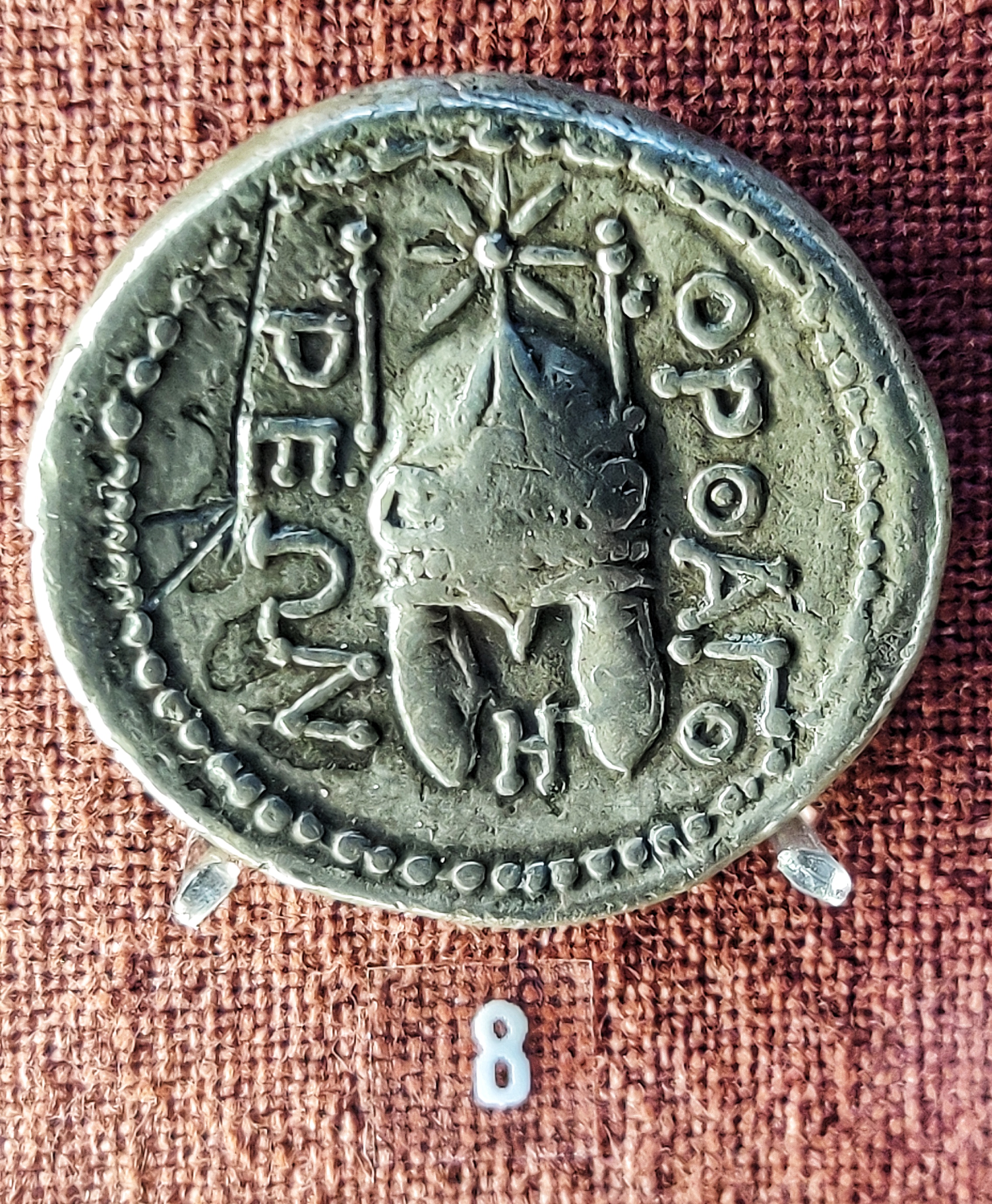
Coin of Orthagoria in the Numismatic Museum of Athens

Orthagoria (Ancient Greek: Ὀρθαγορία) or Orthagoreia (Ὀρθαγορεία) was an ancient Greek town of ancient Thrace, located on the coast of the Aegean Sea. Pliny the Elder says Ortagurea (perhaps the same as Orthagoria) was the old name of Maroneia, but Strabo places both cities successively in the Thracian region. Some have suggested that Orthagoria was the ancient name of Stageira.

Coins minted by Orthagoria of silver and bronze, with the inscription ΟΡΘΑΓΟΡΕΩΝ, are preserved.

Its site is unlocated.

== See also ==
- Greek colonies in Thrace
