= Dacian fortress of Tilișca =

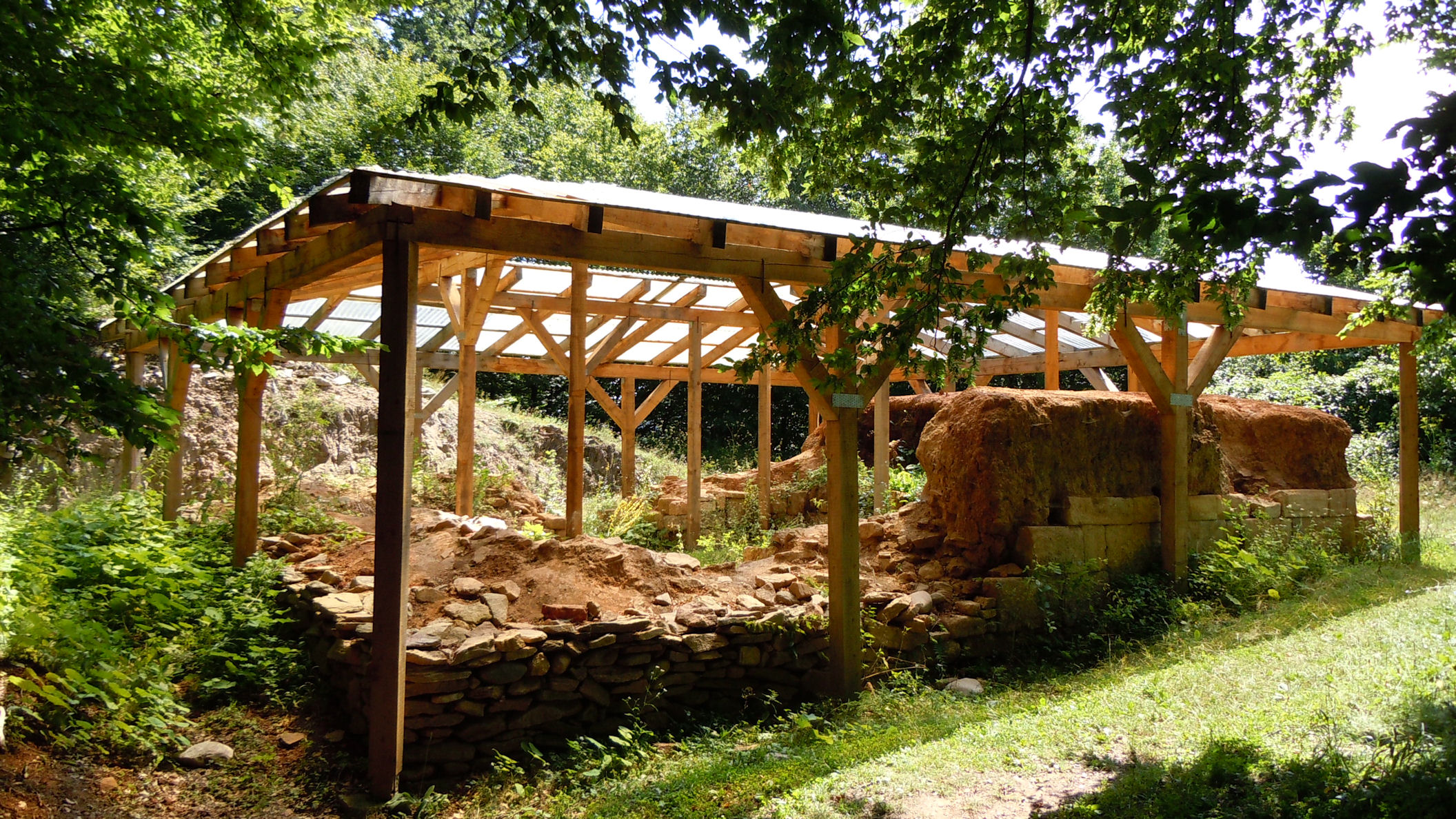
- Tower house, the main building of this site

- Location within Romania
- 45.8023°N 23.8483°E
- Location: Cățânaș Hill, Tilișca, Sibiu, Romania

History
- Built: c. 300 BC
- Abandoned: c. 106 AD

Site notes
- Elevation: 700 m (2,300 ft)
- Condition: Ruined

Monument istoric
- Reference no.: SB-I-s-A-12008

It was a Dacian fortified town.

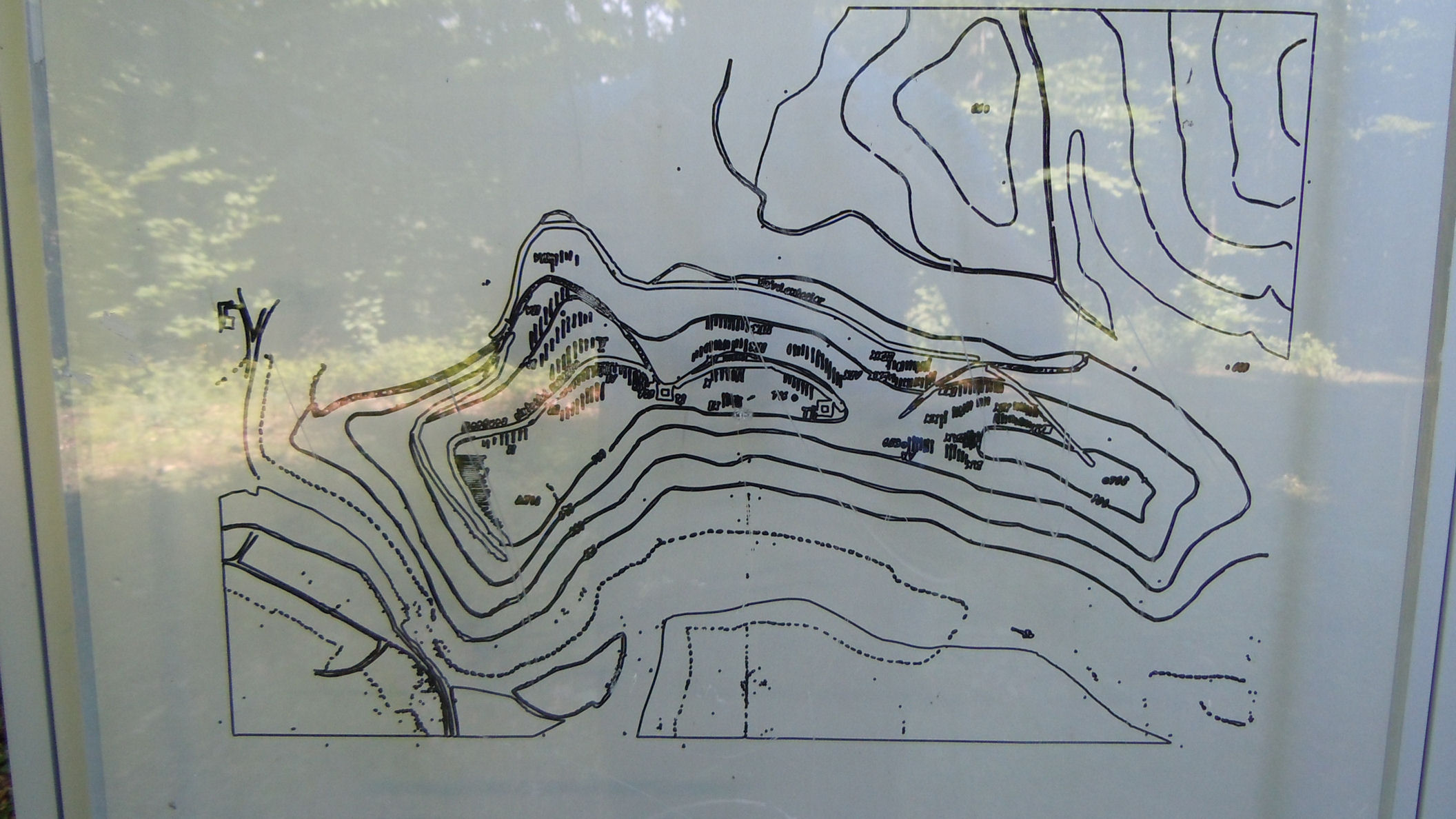

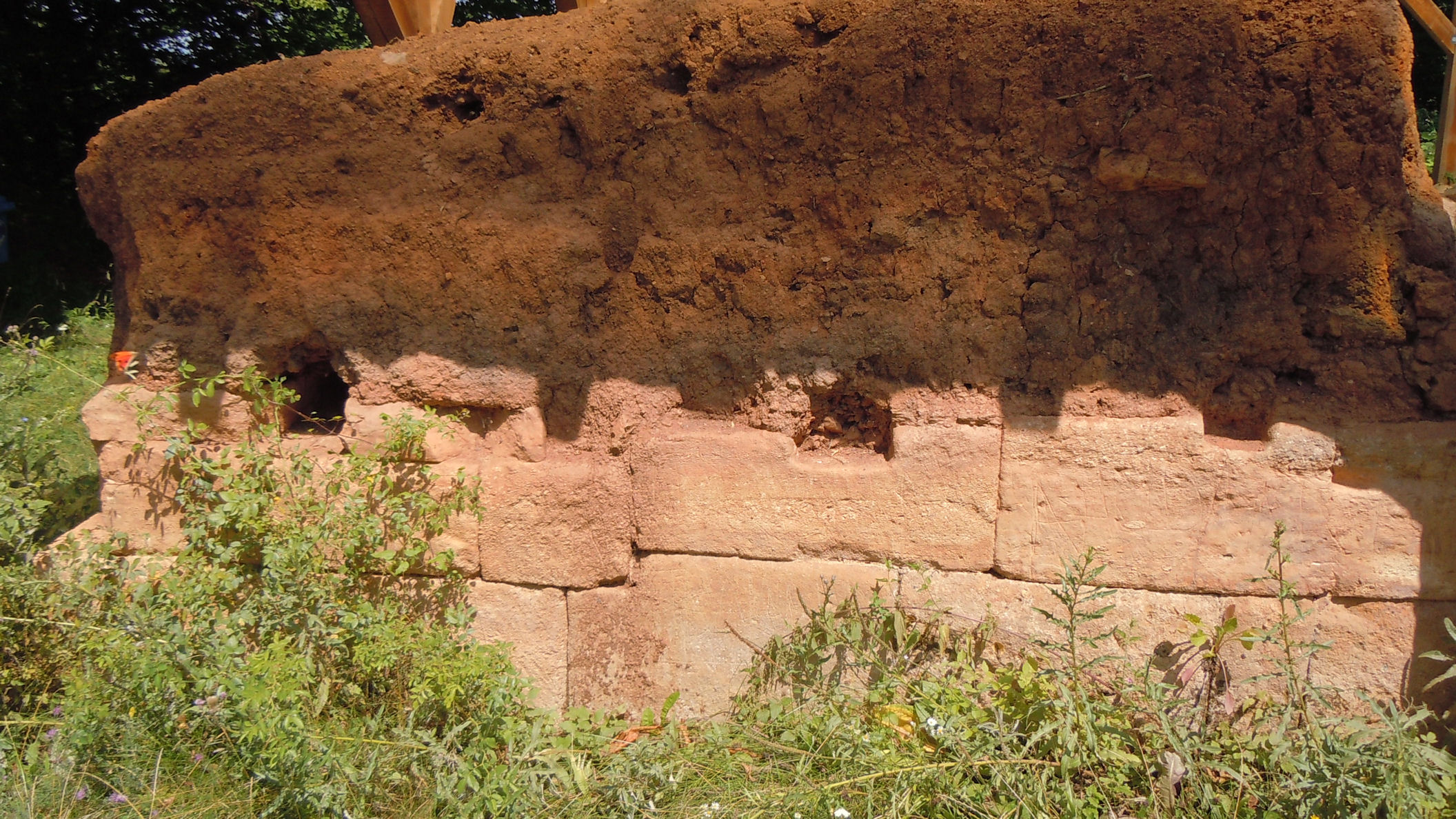

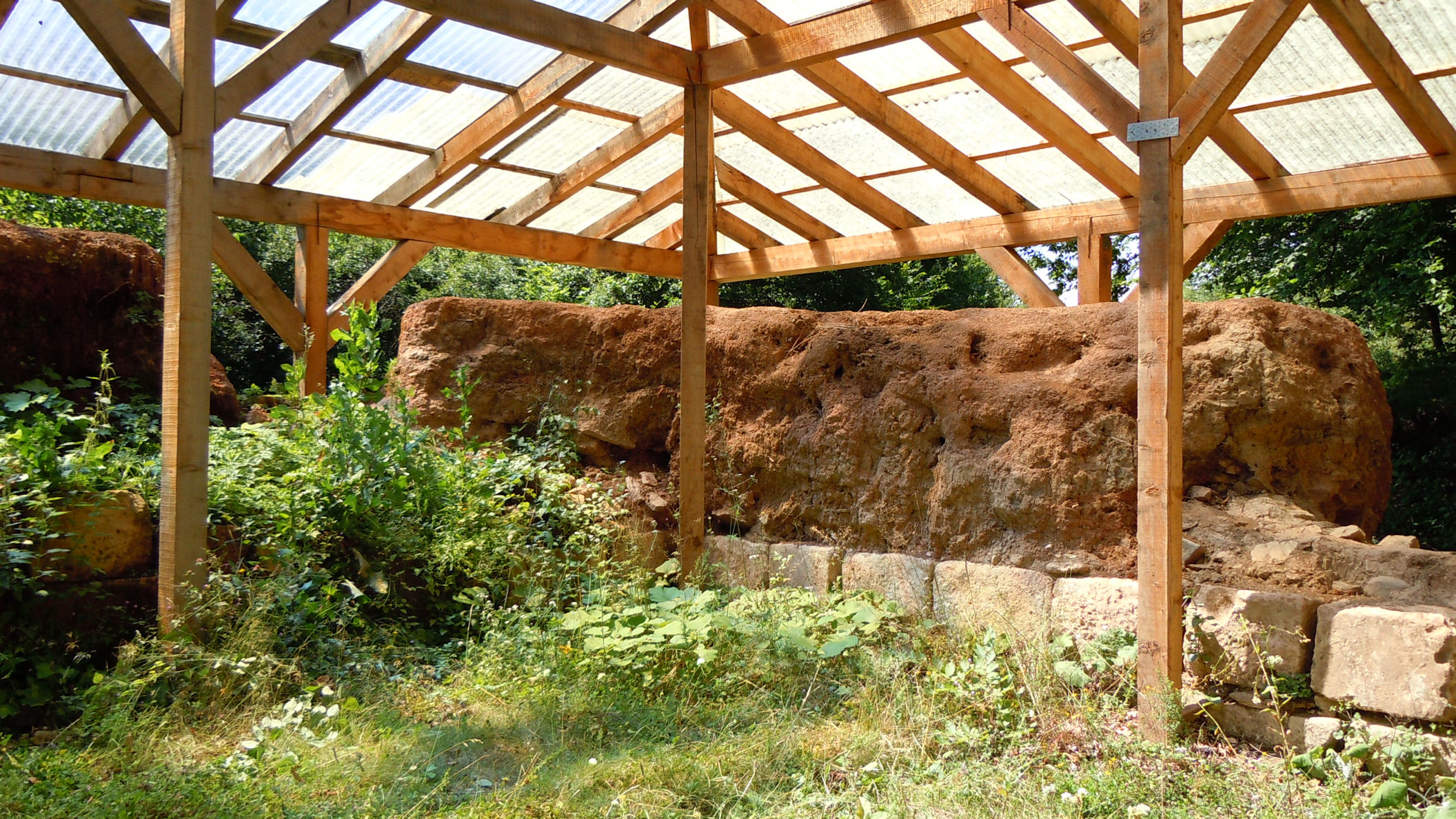

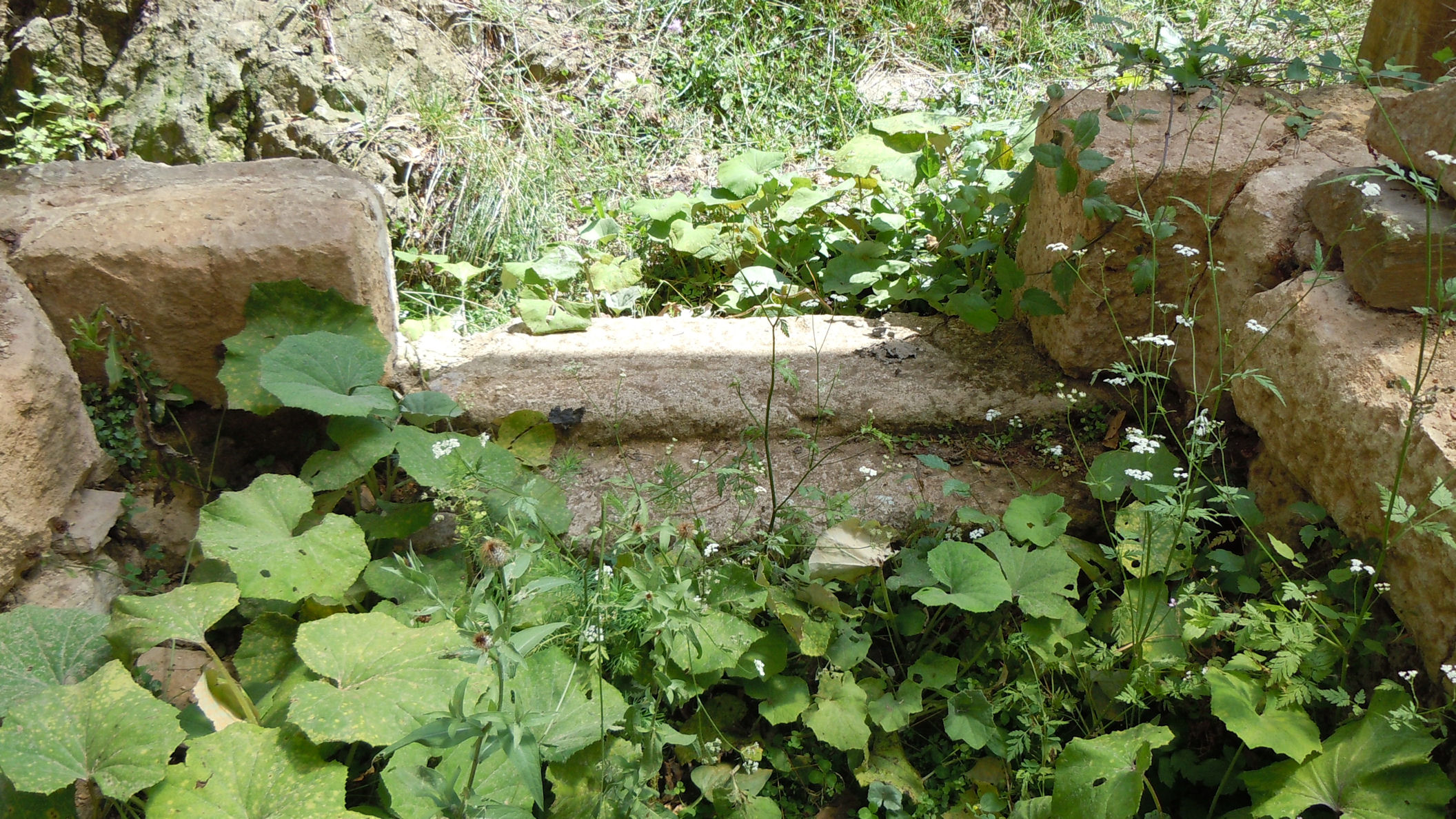

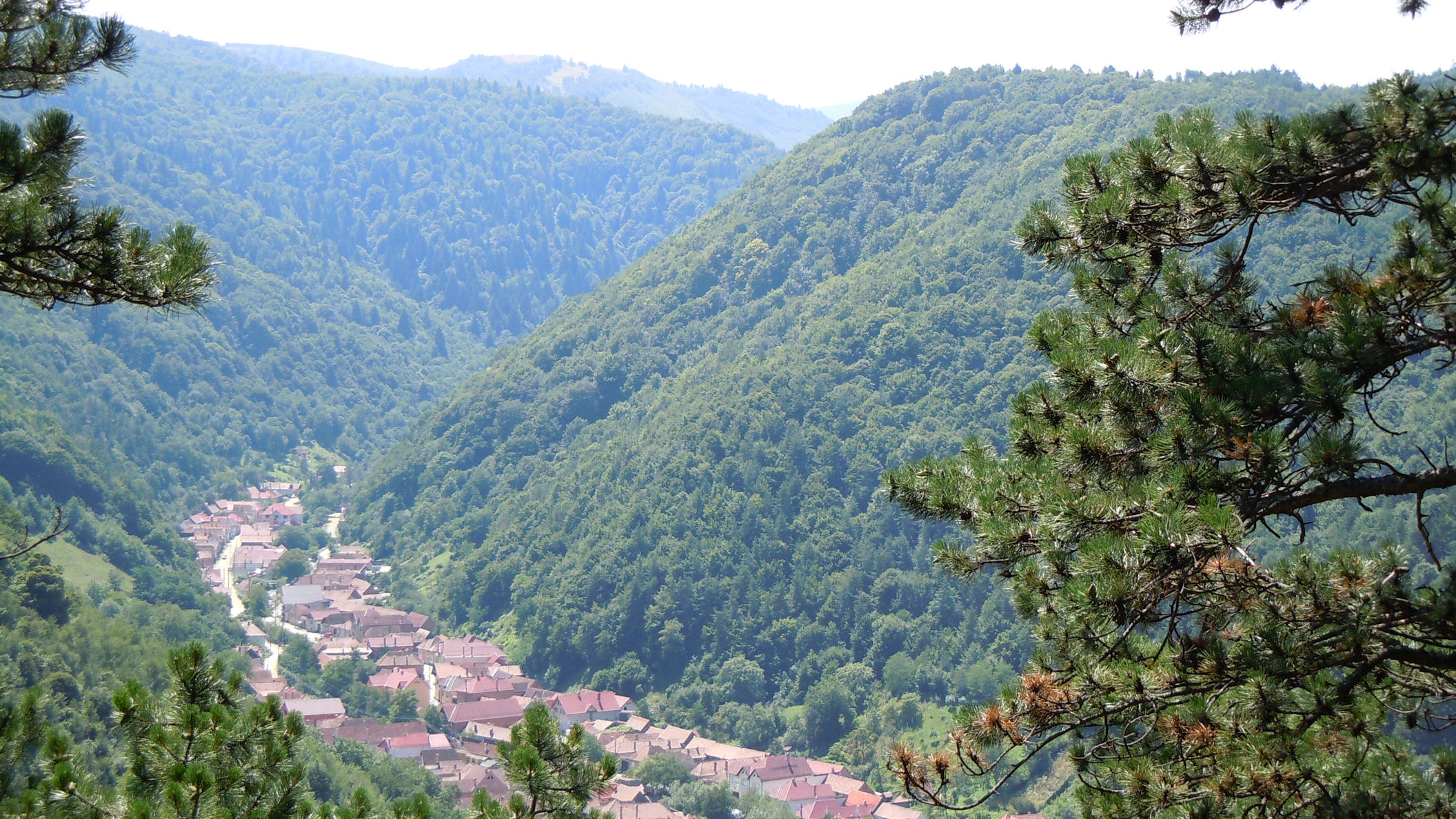
