= Neapolis (Thrace) =

Ancient Greek city in Thrace

Coordinates: 40°56′06″N 24°24′54″E

Neapolis (Ancient Greek: Νεάπολις) was an ancient Greek city, located in Edonis, a region of ancient Thrace and later of Macedon. The site is located near modern Kavala.

Neapolis was founded by colonists from Thasos, perhaps around the middle of the 7th century BC. Neapolis was a member of the Delian League and entered the Athenian tribute list at 454 BC first by toponym and by 443 BC by city-ethnic name. Recorded a total of fourteen times form 454 to 429 BC, it paid a tribute of 1,000 drachmas a year. It had independence from Thasos as dues of its customs were collected in its own harbour. At one point, property of Neapolitans in Thasos was confiscated by the oligarchs related to a situation from before 463 BC when the Thasian peraia was detached from Thasos. Despite the defection of Thasos from the Delian league in 411 BC, Neapolis remained loyal, causing the Neapolitan oligarchs to flee to Thasos and the confiscation of their property. Neapolis was besieged by the Thasians unsuccessfully, causing the Athenians to praise them for their loyalty and for participating in the siege of Thasos itself in 410 or 409 BC.

Around 350 BC, Philip II of Macedon took Neapolis and used it as Philippi's harbor. At the Battle of Philippi in 42 BC, the harbor was used as a base by the Republican leaders Brutus and Cassius. It kept its importance as a station on the Via Egnatia through the Imperial and early Christian periods. Acts 16:11 notes that Paul landed here when he sailed from Troas to begin his missionary labors in Europe. From here he went to nearby Philippi.

== See also ==
- Greek colonies in Thrace
