= Dacian fortress of Petrila =

- Location within Romania
- 45.449°N 23.416°E
- Location: Valea Petrosului, Petrila, Hunedoara, Romania

Site notes
- Condition: Ruined

It was a Dacian fortified town.
