= Dacian Fortresses of the Orăștie Mountains =

UNESCO World Heritage Site
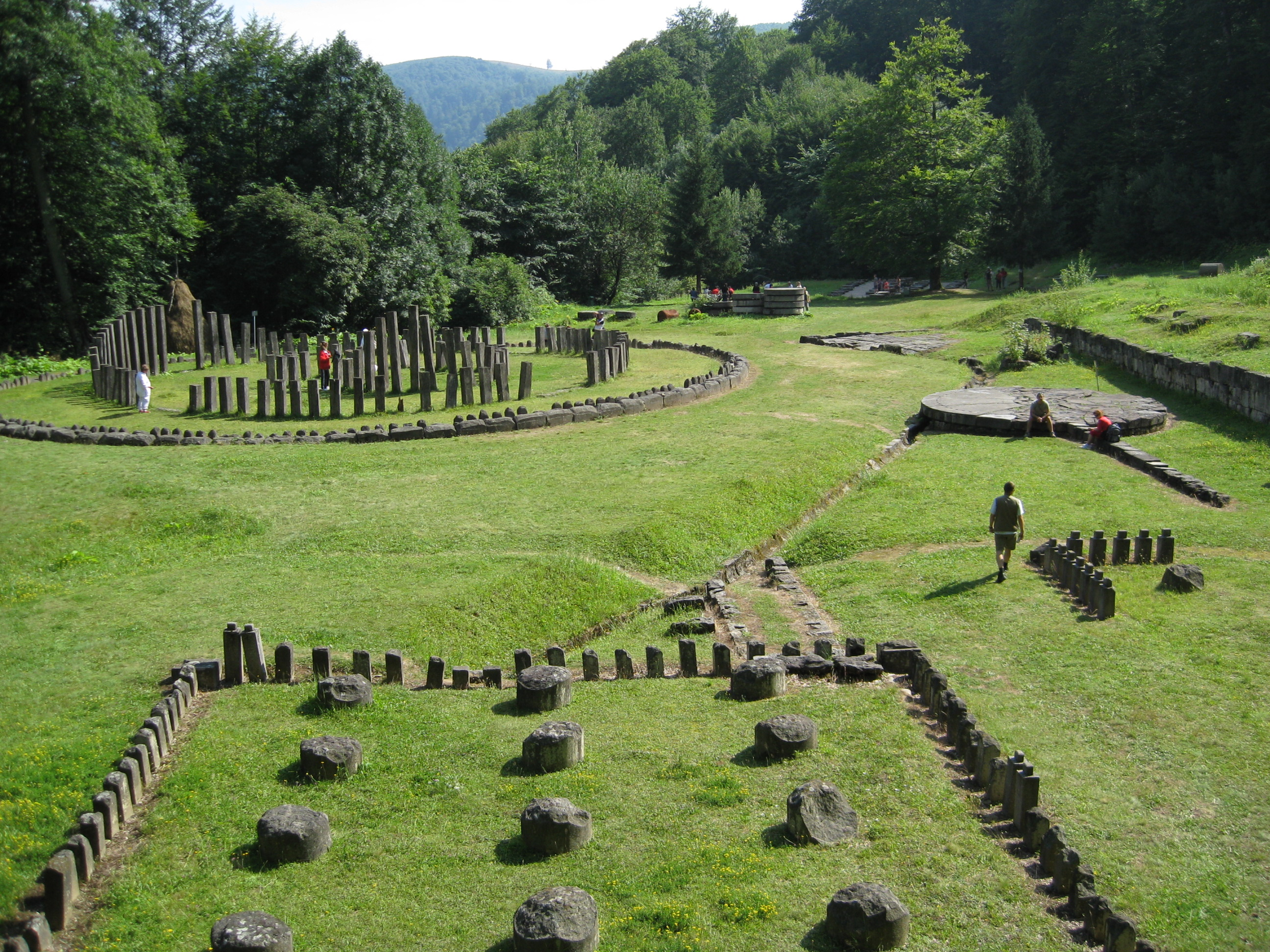
- Ruins of sanctuaries and solar disk at Sarmizegetusa Regia, Romania
- Interactive map of Dacian Fortresses of the Orăștie Mountains
- Location: Hunedoara County, Alba County, Romania
- Includes: Sarmizegetusa, Costești-Cetățuie, Costești-Blidaru, Luncani-Piatra Roșie, Bănița and Căpâlna
- Criteria: Cultural: ii, iii, iv
- Reference: 906
- Inscription: 1999 (23rd Session)

Built in murus dacicus style, the six Dacian Fortresses of the Orăștie Mountains (Romanian: Cetăți dacice din Munții Orăștiei), in Romania, were created in the 1st centuries BC and AD as protection against Roman conquest, and played an important role during the Roman–Dacian wars.

Their extensive and well-preserved remains present a picture of a vigorous and innovative ancient civilization. Today, treasure-hunters sometimes search the area, as Romania lacks legislation in this domain (see Archaeological looting in Romania).

The six fortresses — Sarmizegetusa Regia, Costești-Cetățuie, Costești-Blidaru, Piatra Roșie, Bănița, and Căpâlna — that formed the defensive system of Decebalus were designated as a UNESCO World Heritage Site in 1999. All the sites are in Hunedoara County, except for Căpâlna, which is in Alba County.

== Sarmizegetusa Regia ==
The town of Sarmizegetusa Regia was the capital and major fortress of the Dacian kingdom, probably built in the mid first century BCE. It consisted of perimeter walls and fortifications, a sacred precinct, and a settlement area primarily for nobles and supporting servants. It was located at the top of a 1,200 metres (3,900 feet) hill with excellent visibility of the surrounding lands. The sacred precinct was on the east side of the town, with a prominent plaza and circular shrines. There were two settlement areas one on the east side and a larger one on the west. In addition to dwellings they included workshops, storage buildings, and agricultural processing areas. Notable for the time is a distribution system for drinking water that used ceramic pipes.

== Piatra Roșie ==
Piatra Roșie, which means Red Rock, was a Dacian hill fort two days march to the west from Costești-Cetățuie, at Luncani in Boșorod commune. It was built in two phases. In the first phase a long (102 m) rectangular main citadel was built at the height of land with watch towers on each end and two outlying watch towers. Later the larger area inside the watch towers was enclosed with walls. It appears that the hilltop was flattened in the process in order to produce a usable space.

== Gallery ==
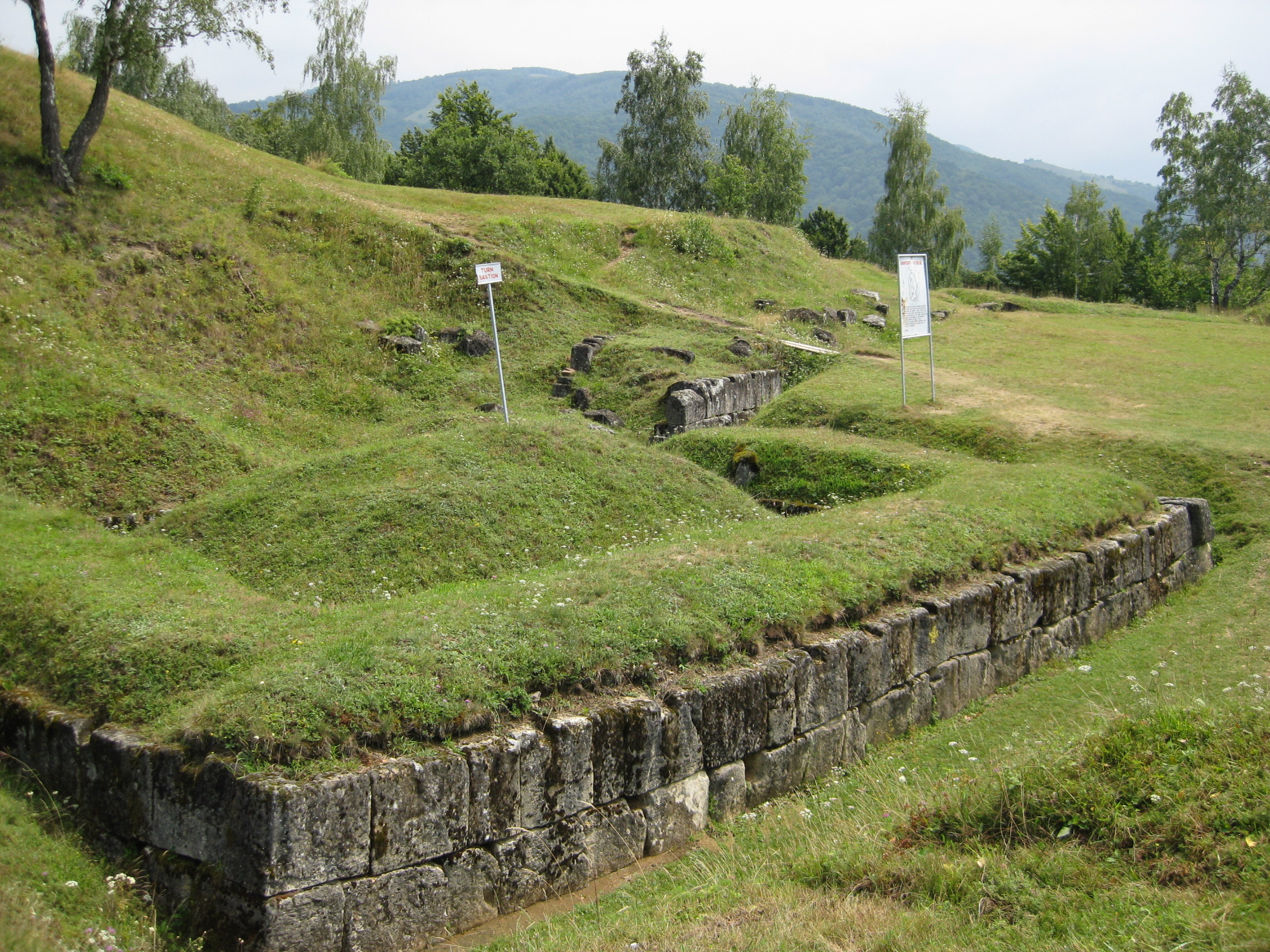
Dacian fortress of Costești

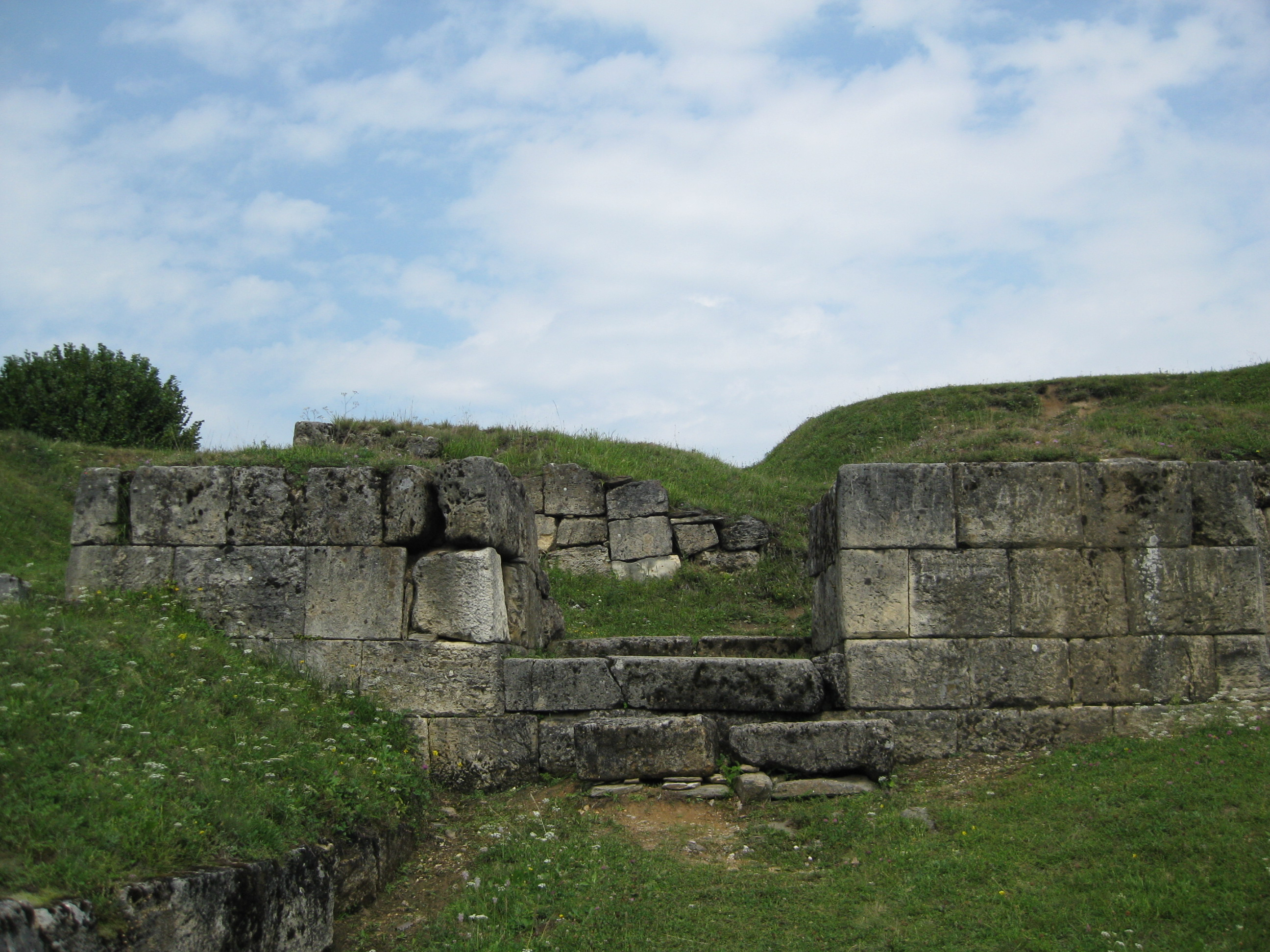
Fortress of Blidaru

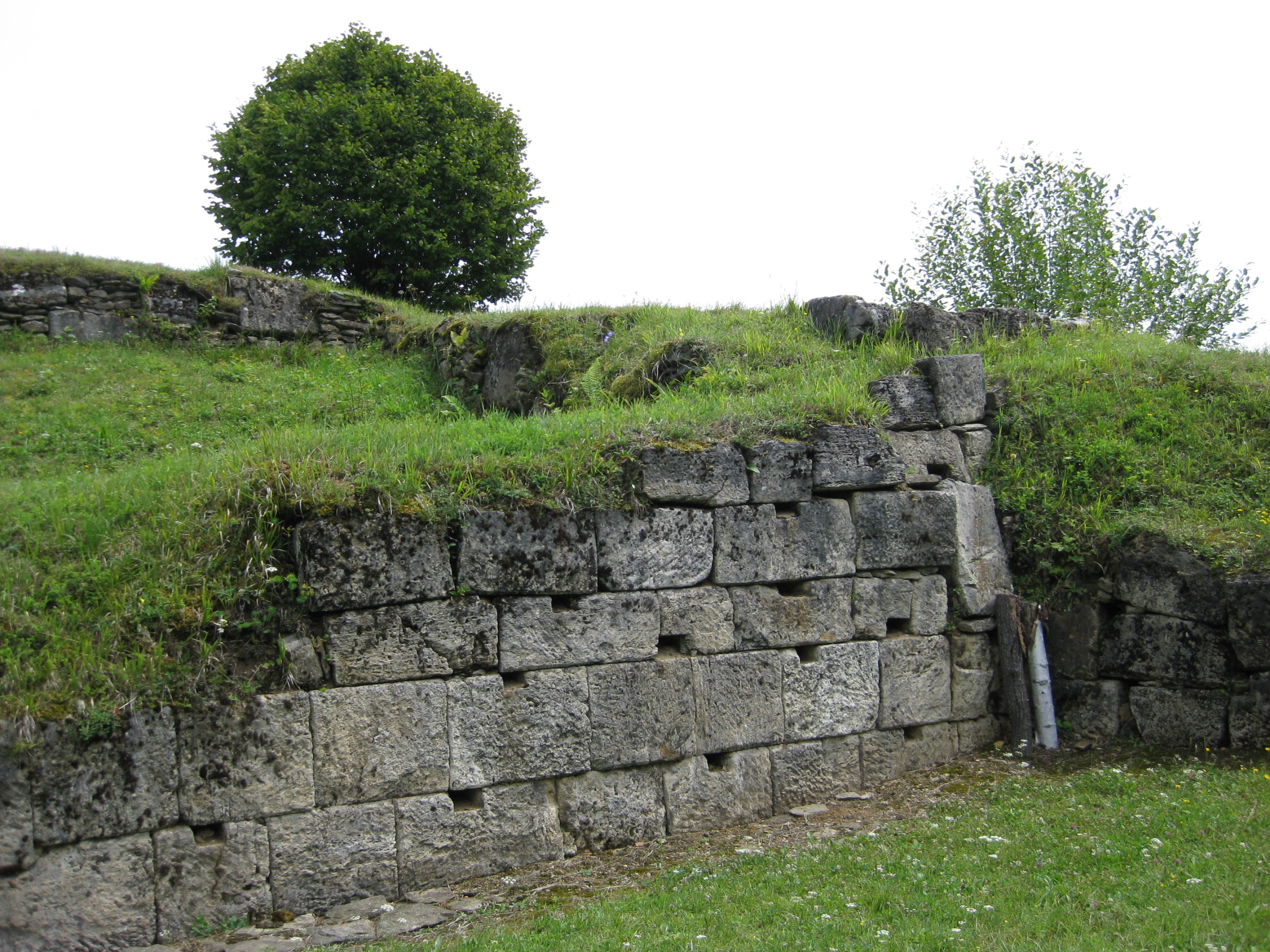
Fortress of Blidaru

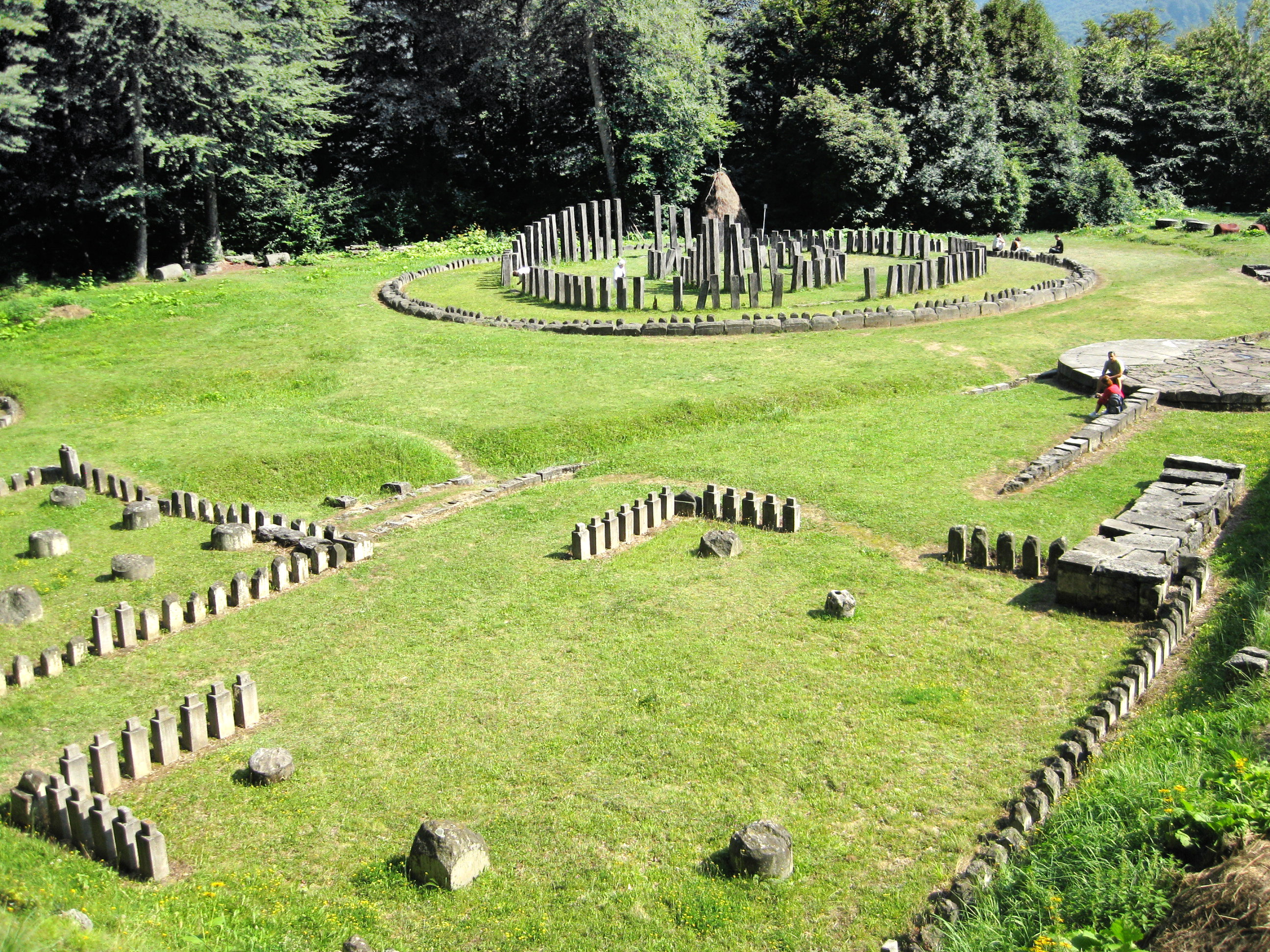
Sanctuaries at Sarmizegetusa Regia

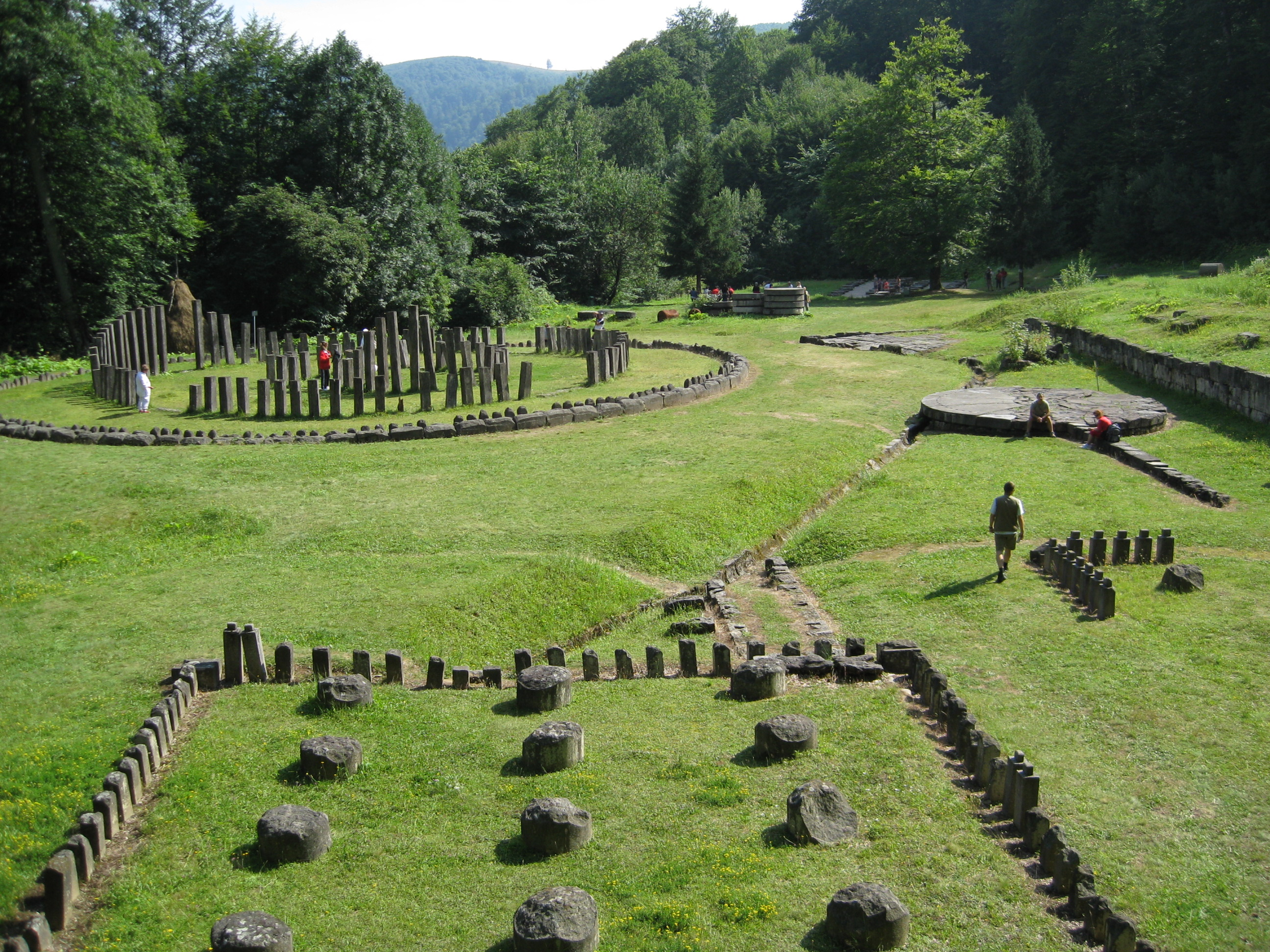
Andesite sanctuaries, Sarmizegetusa Regia

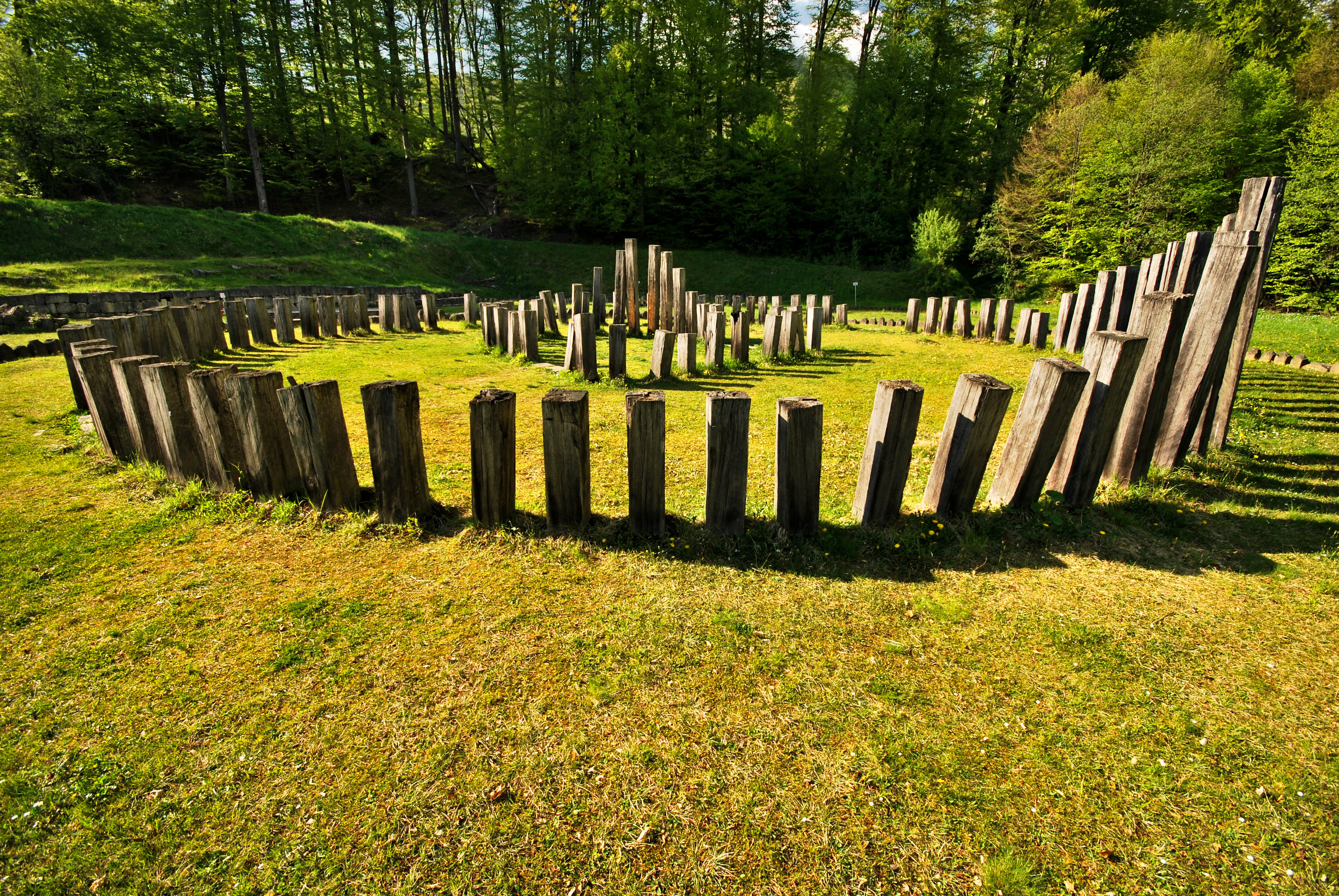
Sarmizegetusa Regia the great circular sanctuary (sacred area)

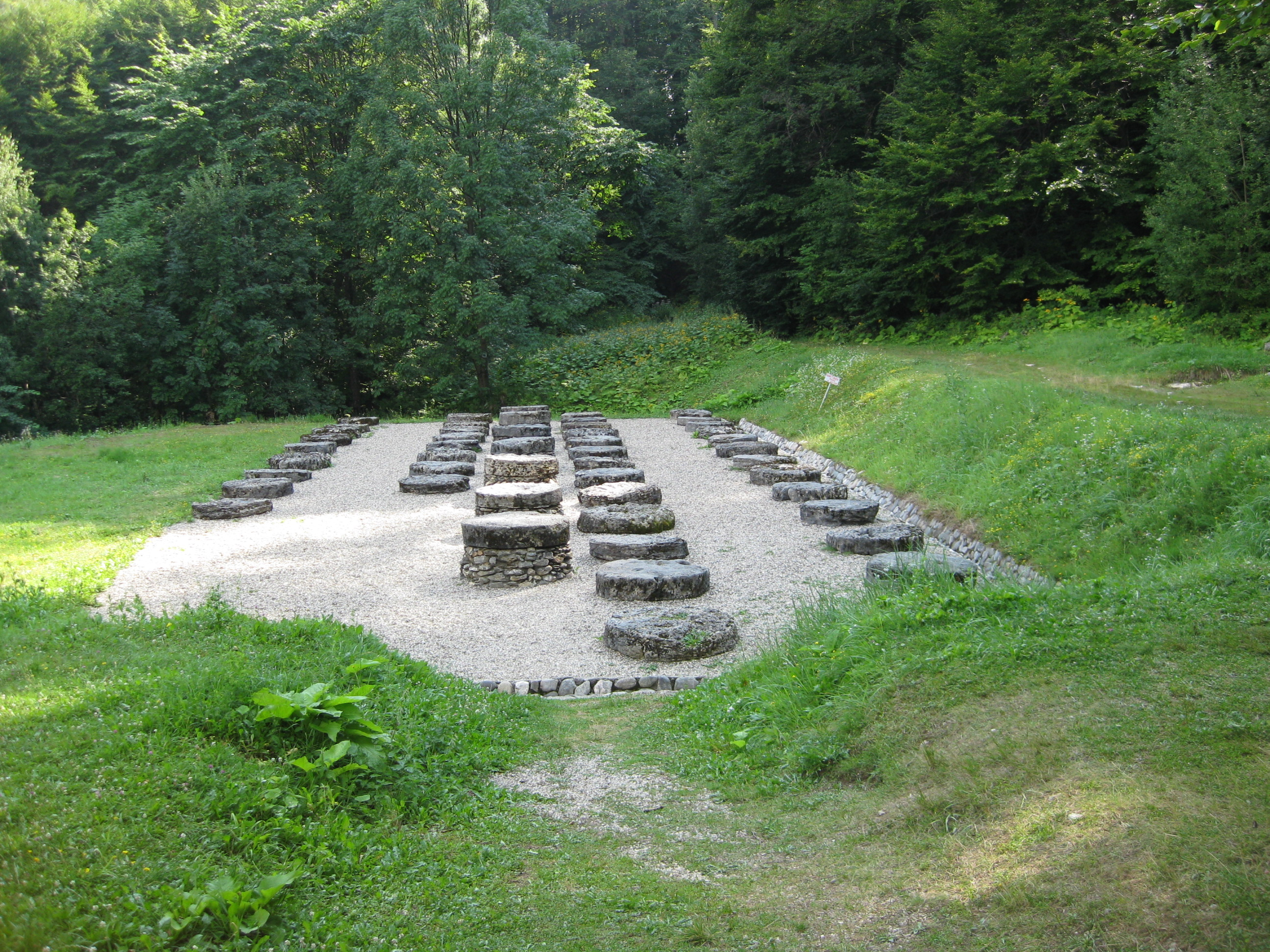
Large limestone sanctuary, Sarmizegetusa Regia

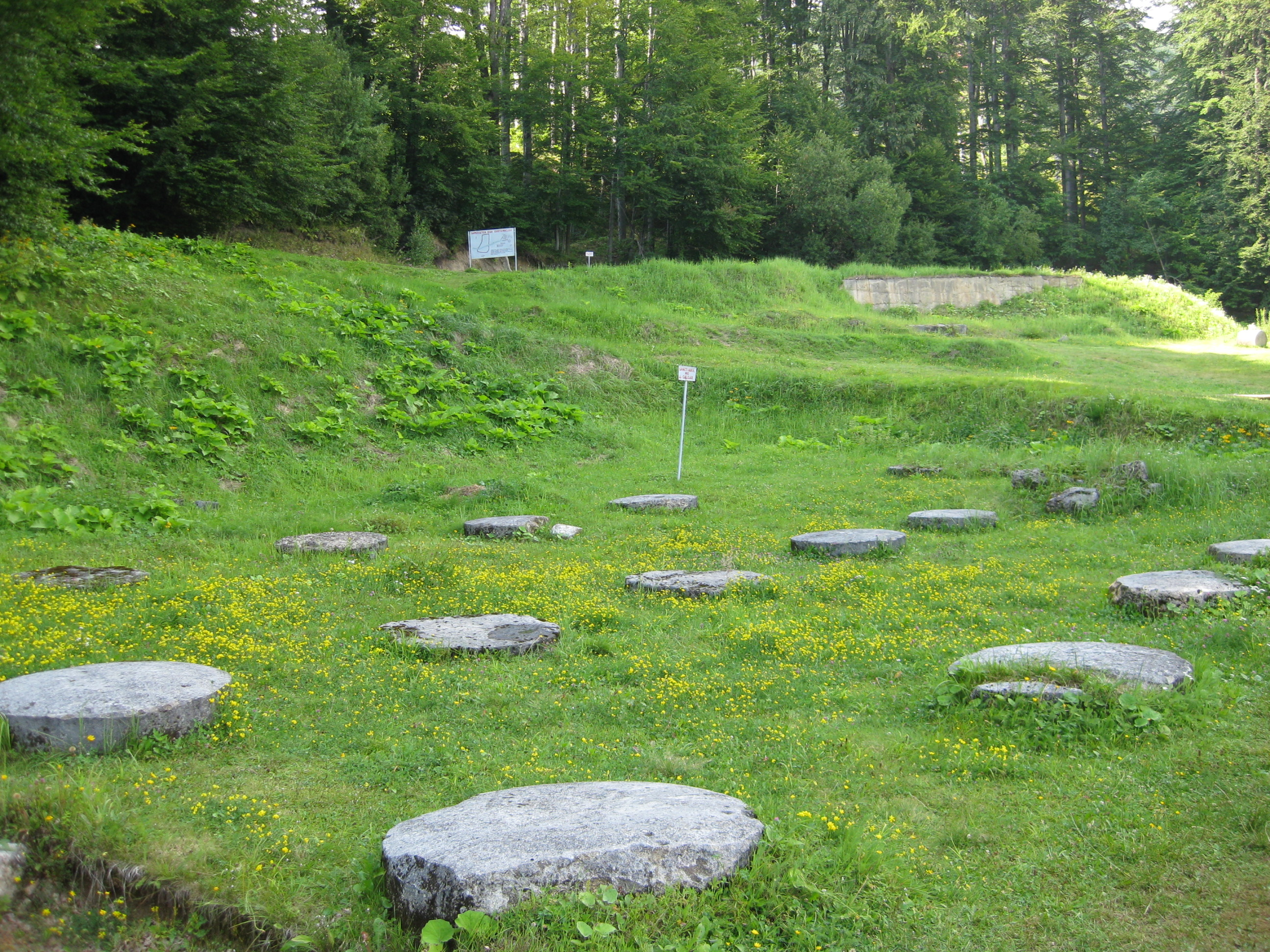
Small limestone sanctuary, Sarmizegetusa Regia

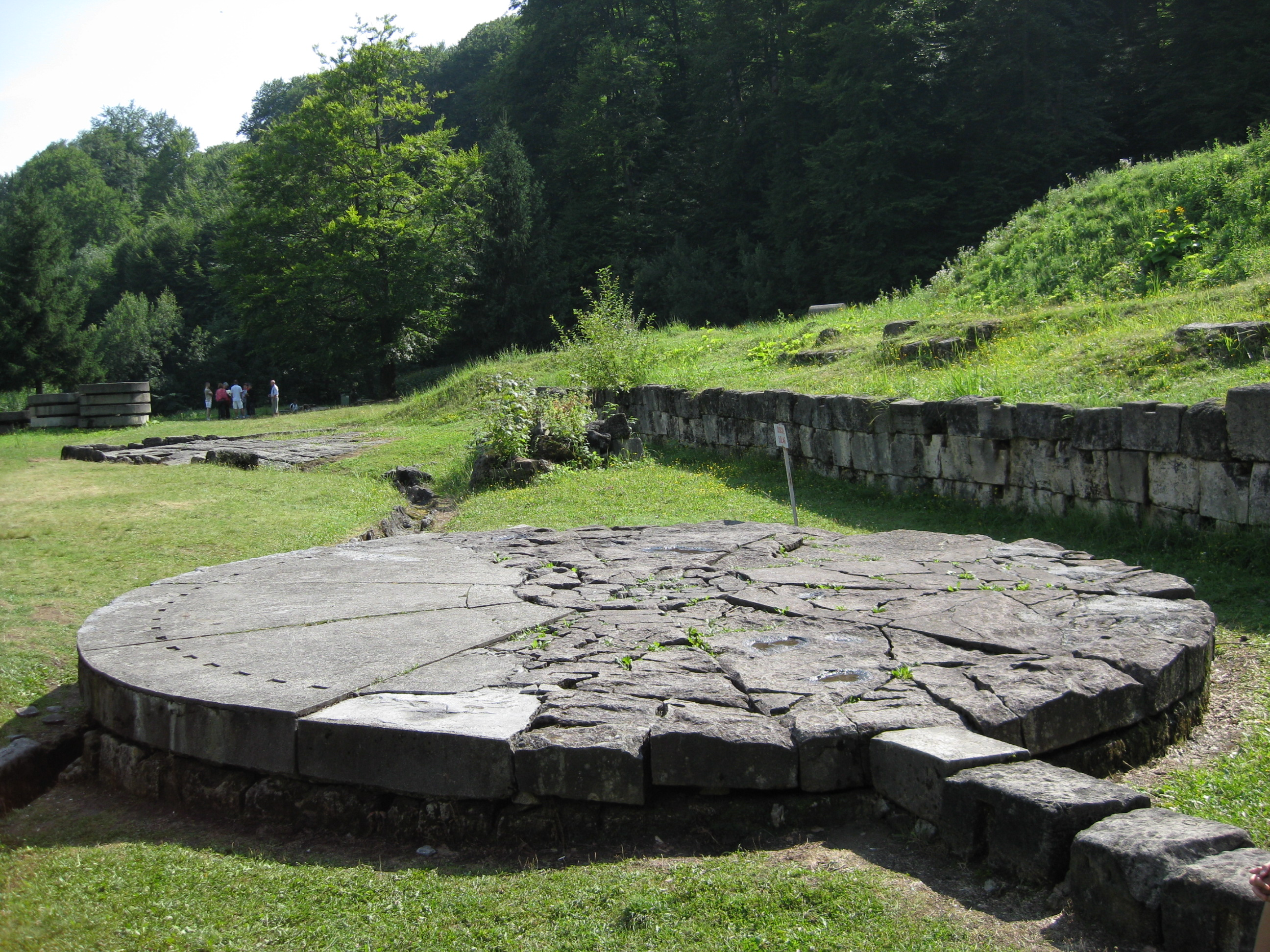
Solar disc, Sarmizegetusa Regia

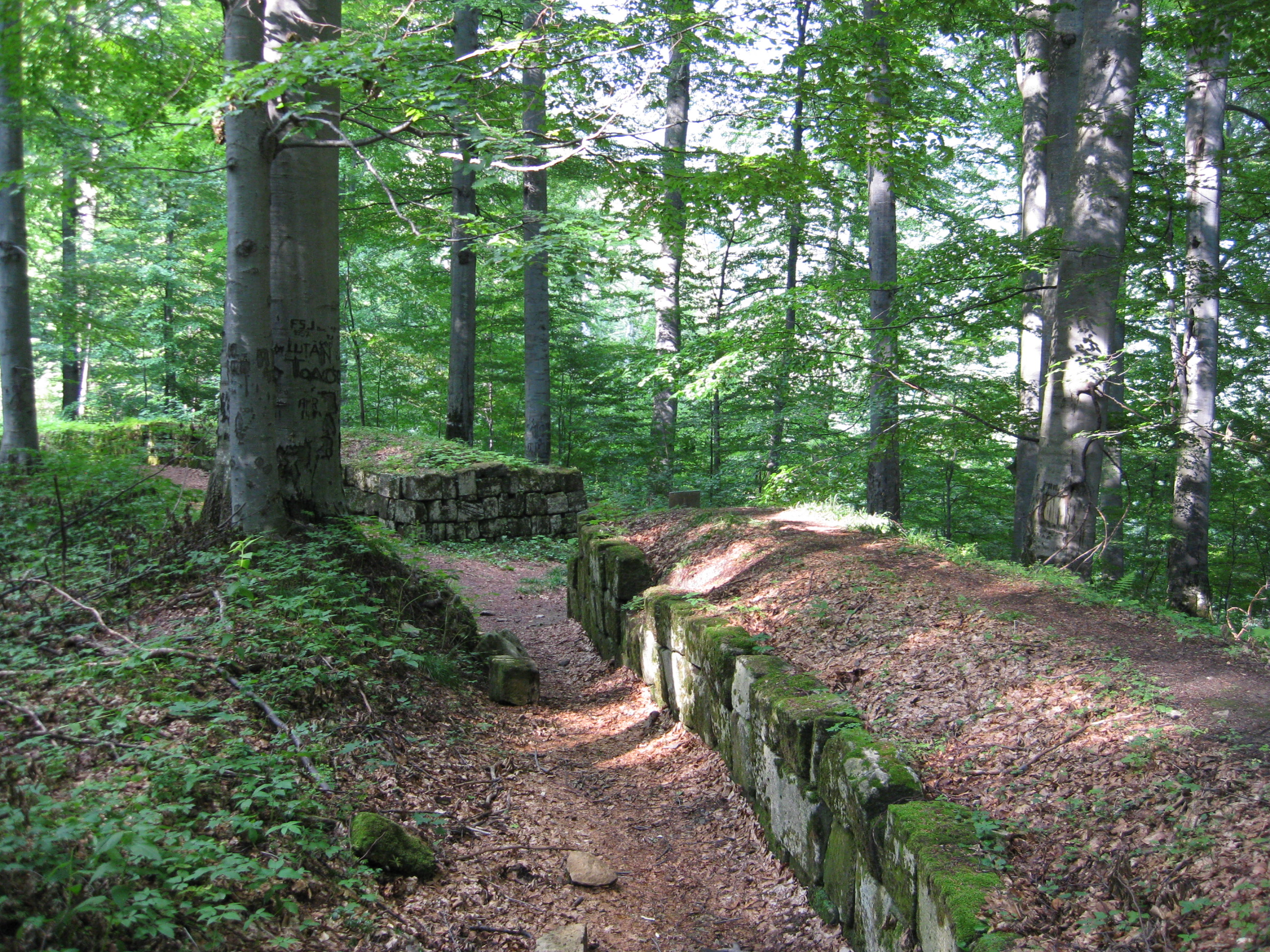
Murus dacicus, Sarmizegetusa Regia

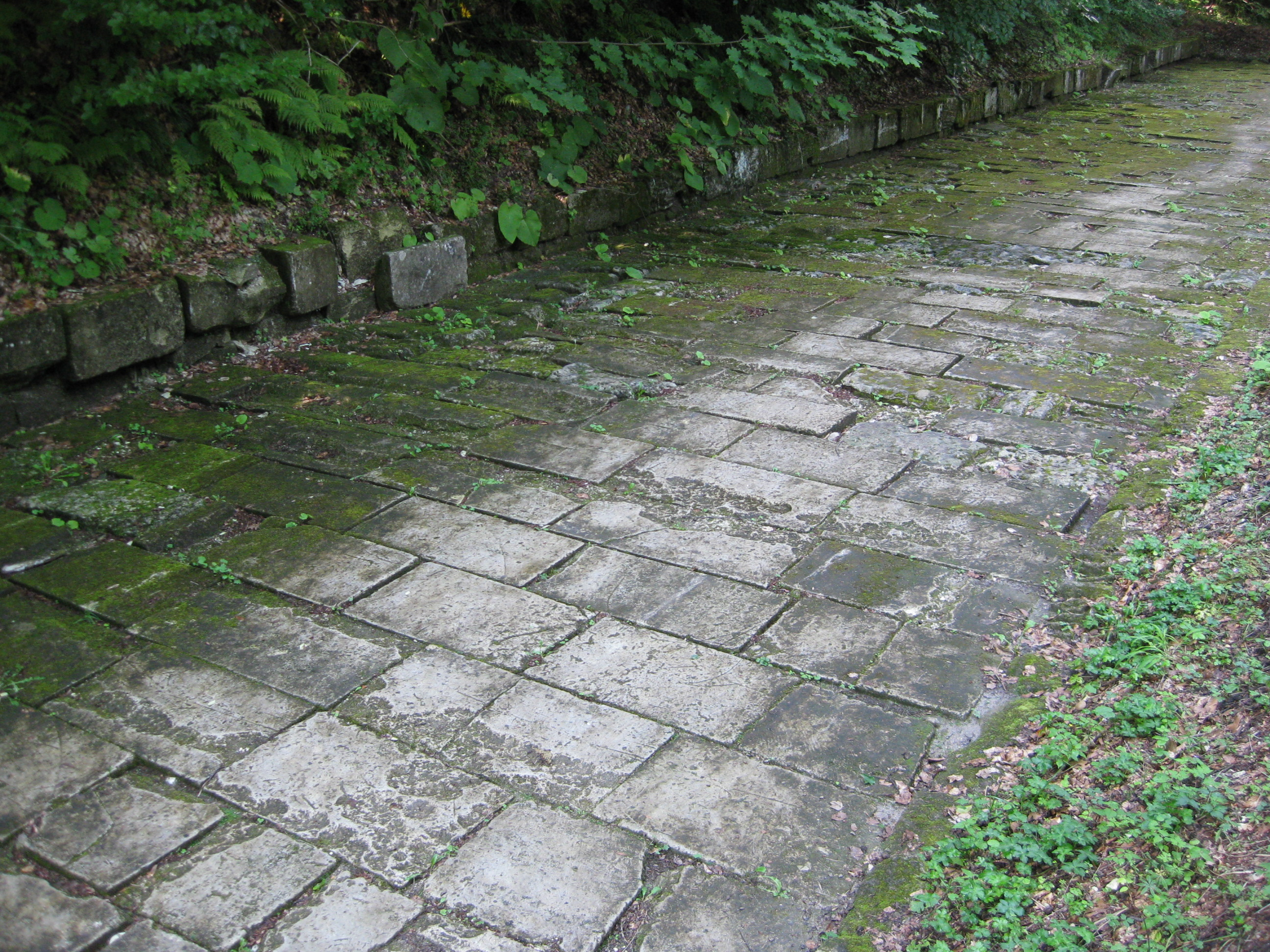
Paved Dacian road, Sarmizegetusa Regia

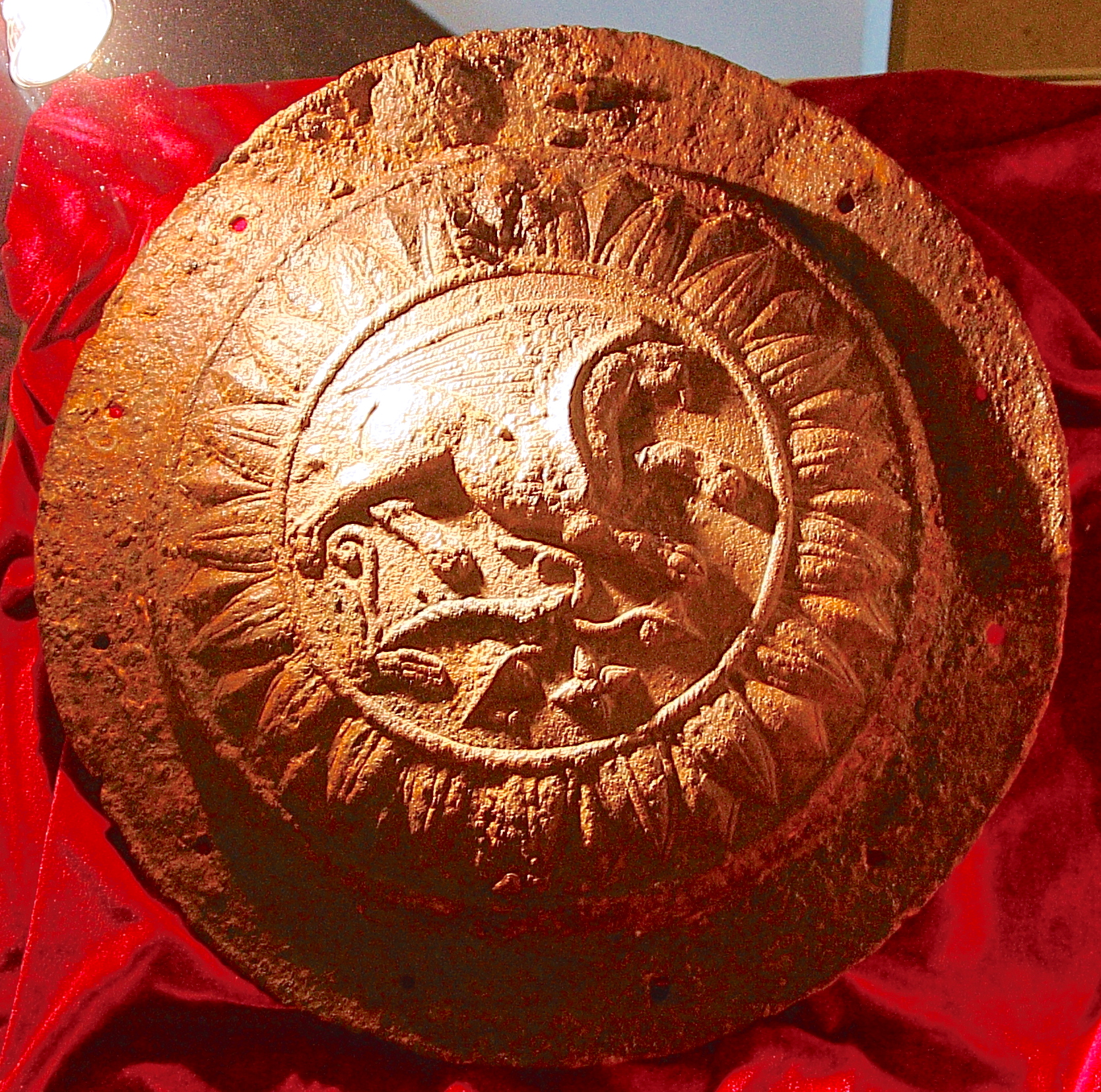
Dacian artifact from Piatra Roșie site. It is still a subject of debate if it is an umbo shield or a gate decoration.

== See also ==
- Burebista
- List of Dacian towns
- Murus dacicus
- Sarmizegetusa Regia
- List of World Heritage Sites in Romania
- Seven Wonders of Romania
- List of kings of Thrace and Dacia
