= Lunkány =

Lunkány is the Hungarian name for three villages in Romania:

- Luncani village, Mărgineni Commune, Bacău County
- Luncani village, Topliţa City, Harghita County
- Luncani village, Boșorod Commune, Hunedoara County
