= Piatra Roșie Dacian fortress =

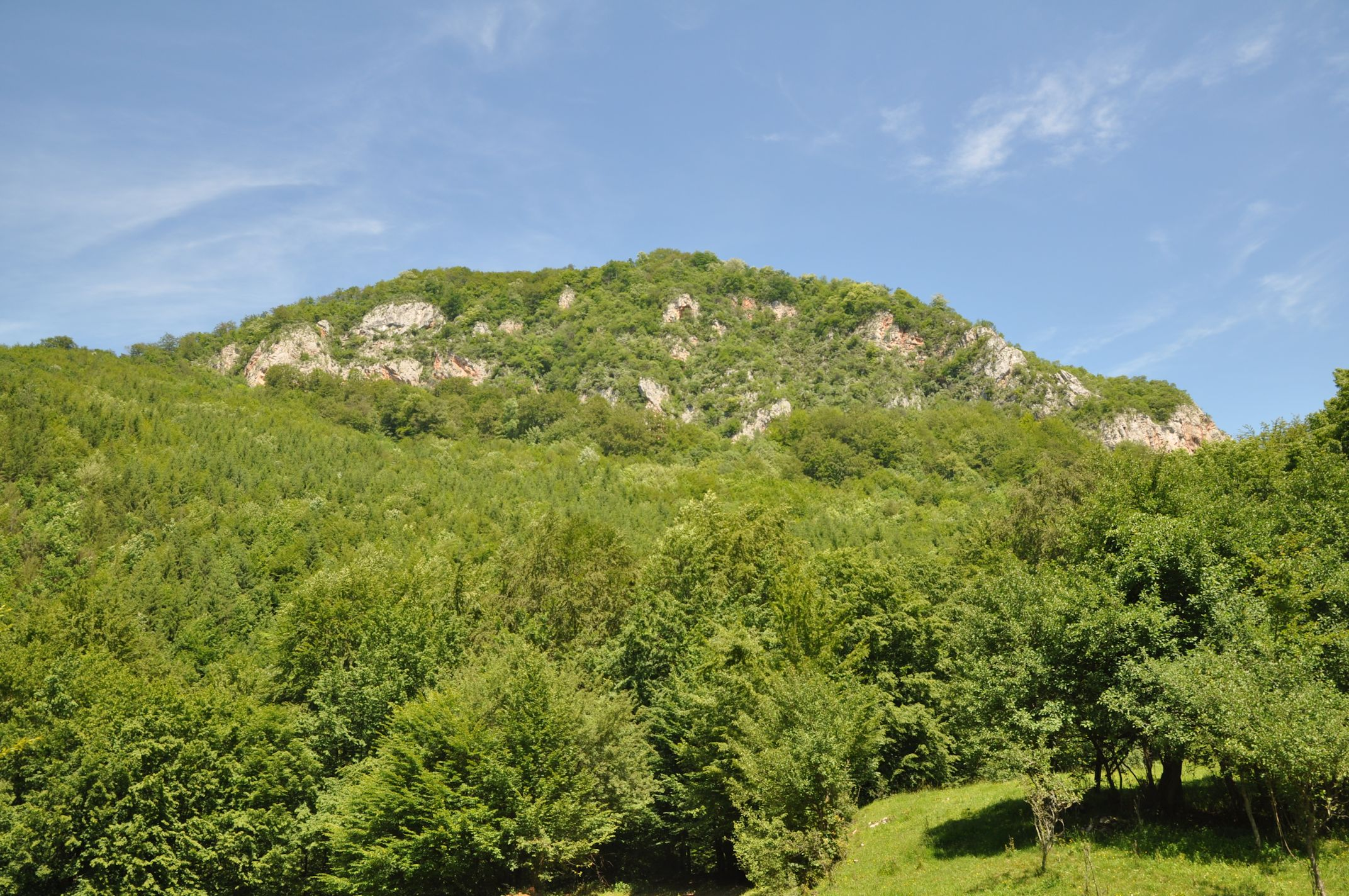
- The hill fort

- Location within Romania
- 45.602264°N 23.147403°E
- Location: Dealul Piatra Roșie, Luncani, Hunedoara County, Romania

History
- Event: Trajan's Dacian Wars

Site notes
- Elevation: 807 m (2,648 ft)
- Condition: Ruined
- Website: www.piatra-rosie.ro

Monument istoric
- Reference no.: HD-I-s-A-03200

UNESCO World Heritage Site
- Part of: Dacian Fortresses of the Orăștie Mountains
- Criteria: Cultural: (ii), (iii), (iv)
- Reference: 906
- Inscription: 1999 (23rd Session)

Piatra Roșie, which means Red Rock, was a Dacian hill fort two days march to the west from Costești-Cetățuie fortress, at Luncani in Boșorod commune, Hunedoara County. It was built in two phases. In the first phase a long (102 m) rectangular main citadel was built at the height of land with watch towers on each end and two outlying watch towers. Later the larger area inside the watch towers was enclosed with walls. It appears that the hilltop was flattened in the process in order to produce a usable space.

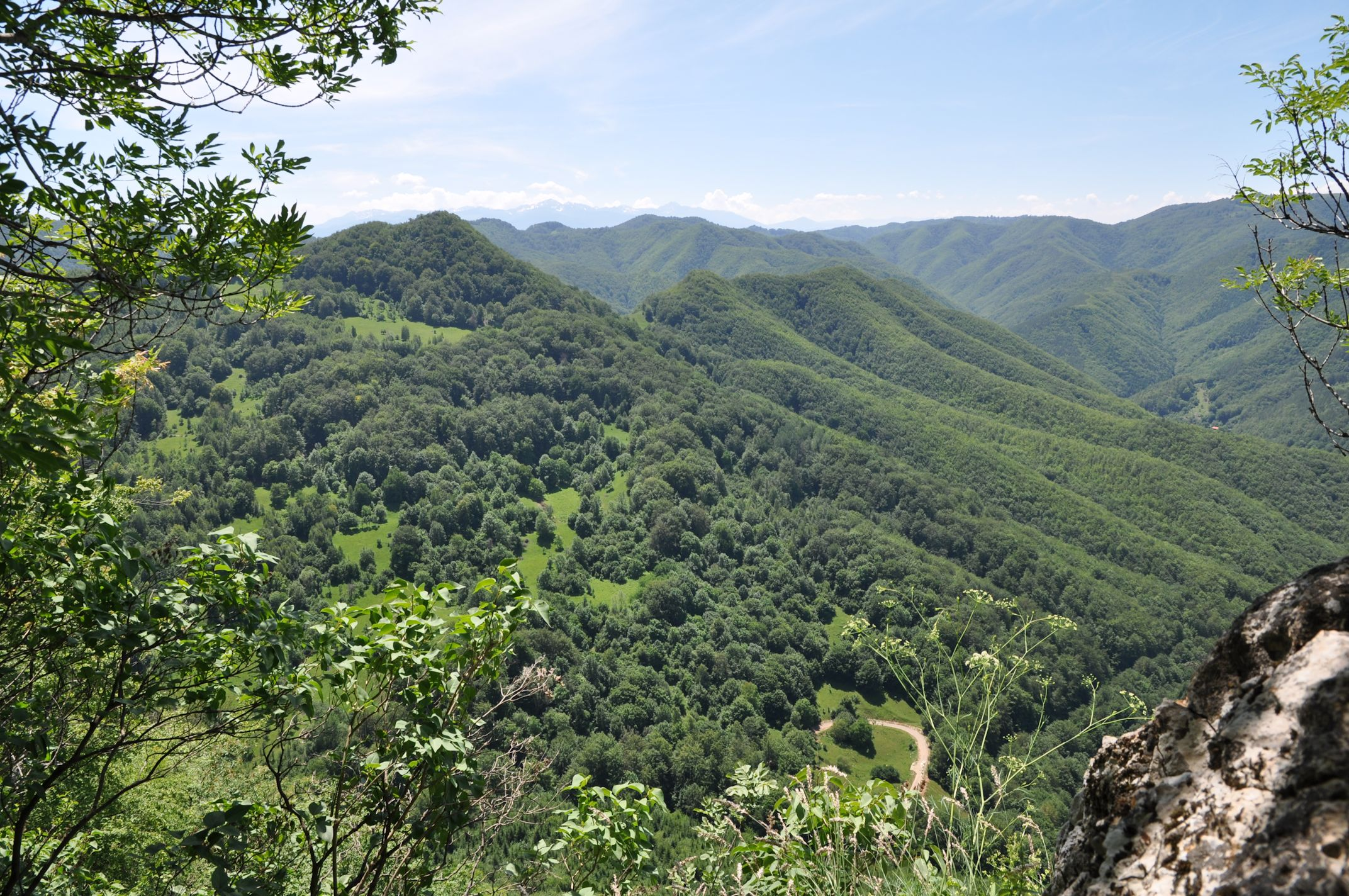
Panoramic view from the fortress

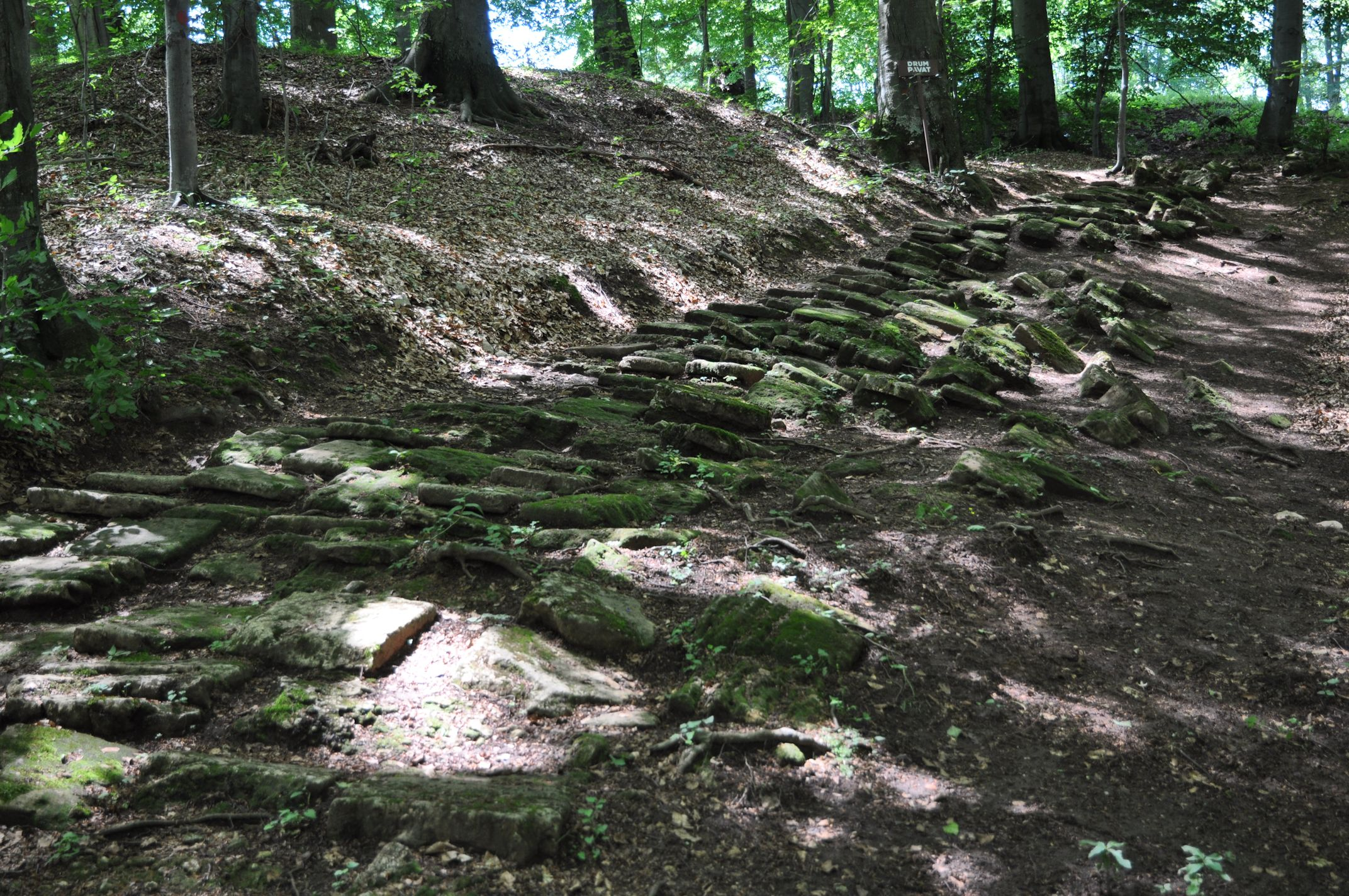
Paved road

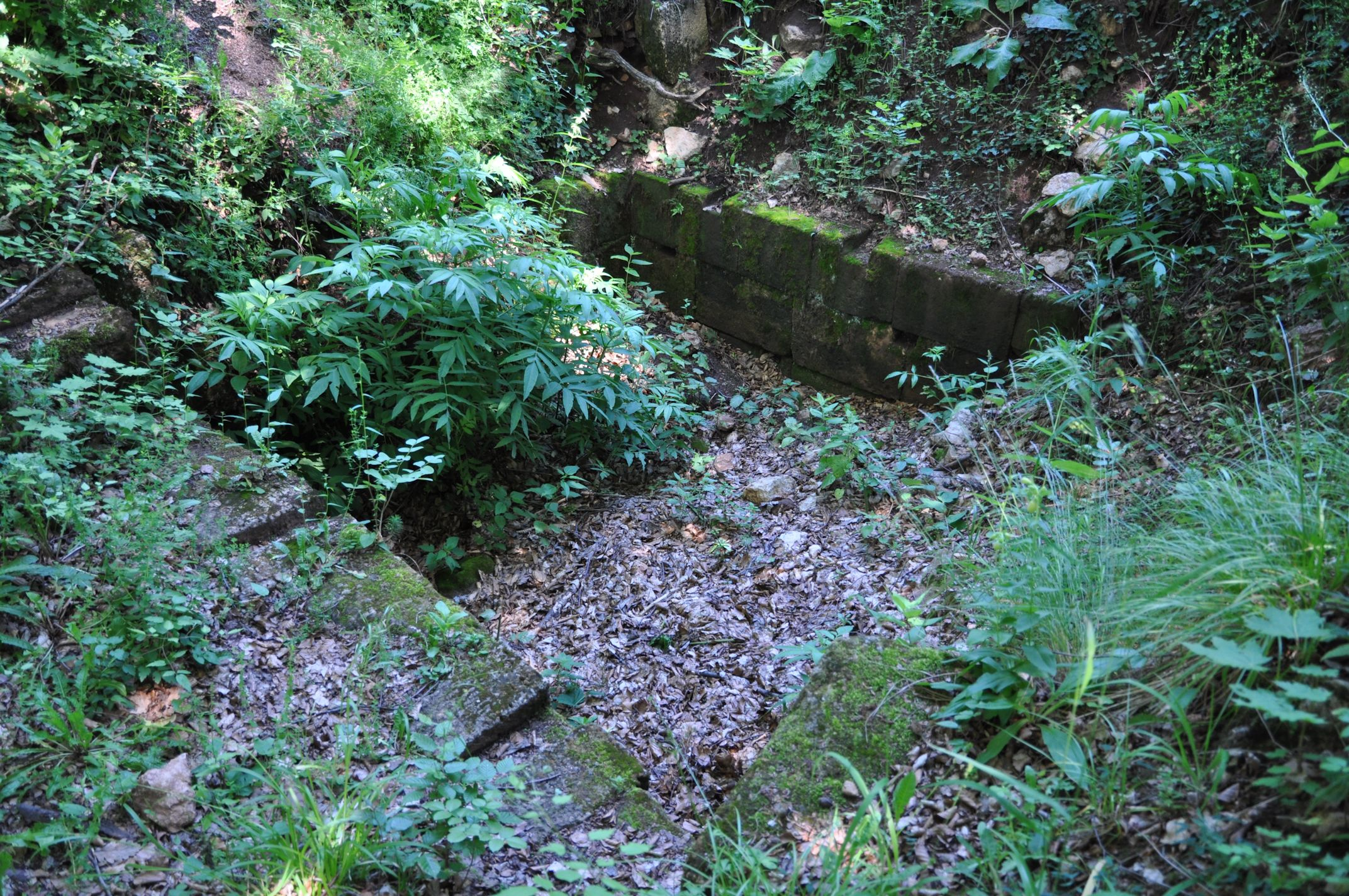
Tower

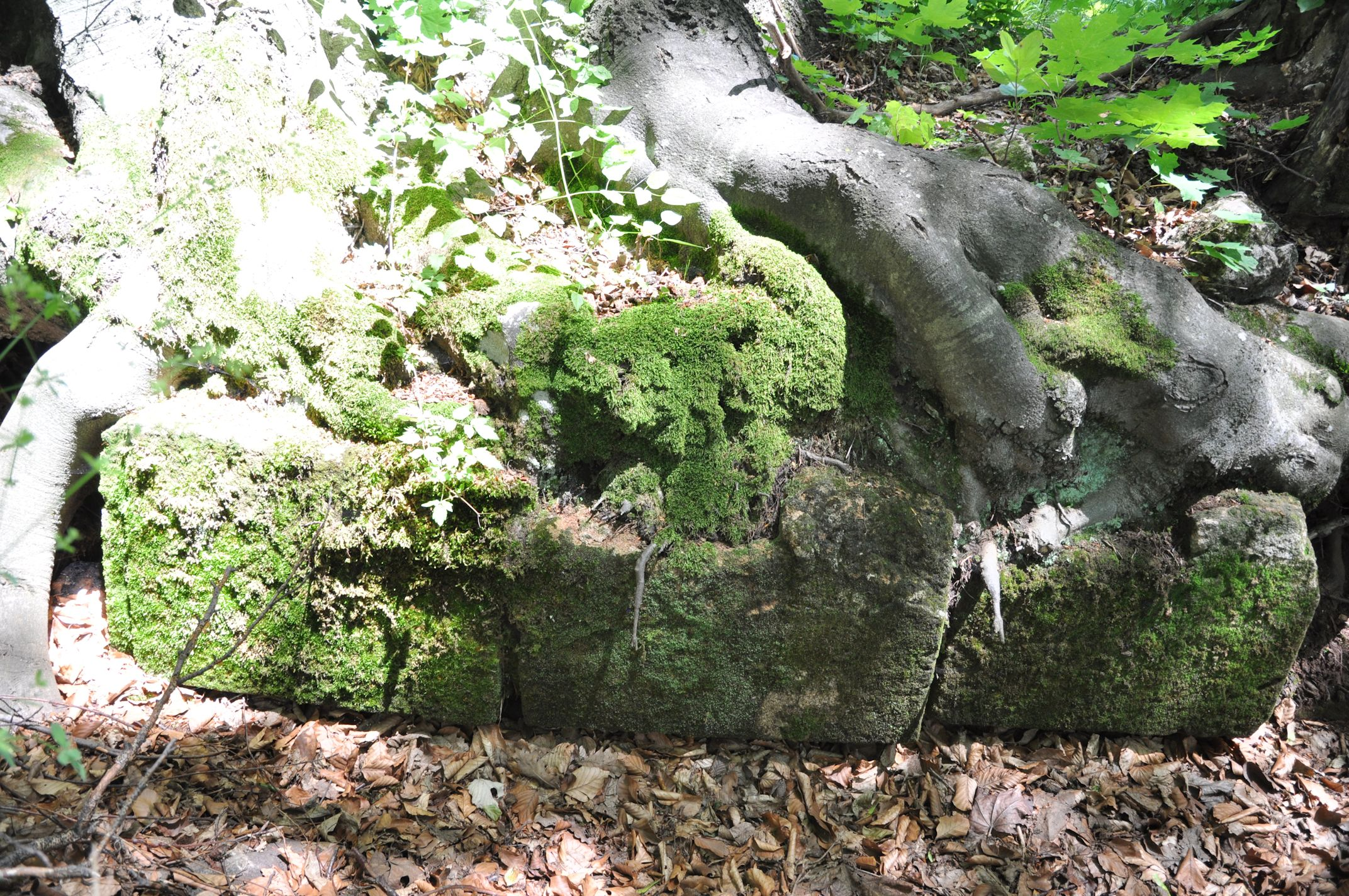
Roots

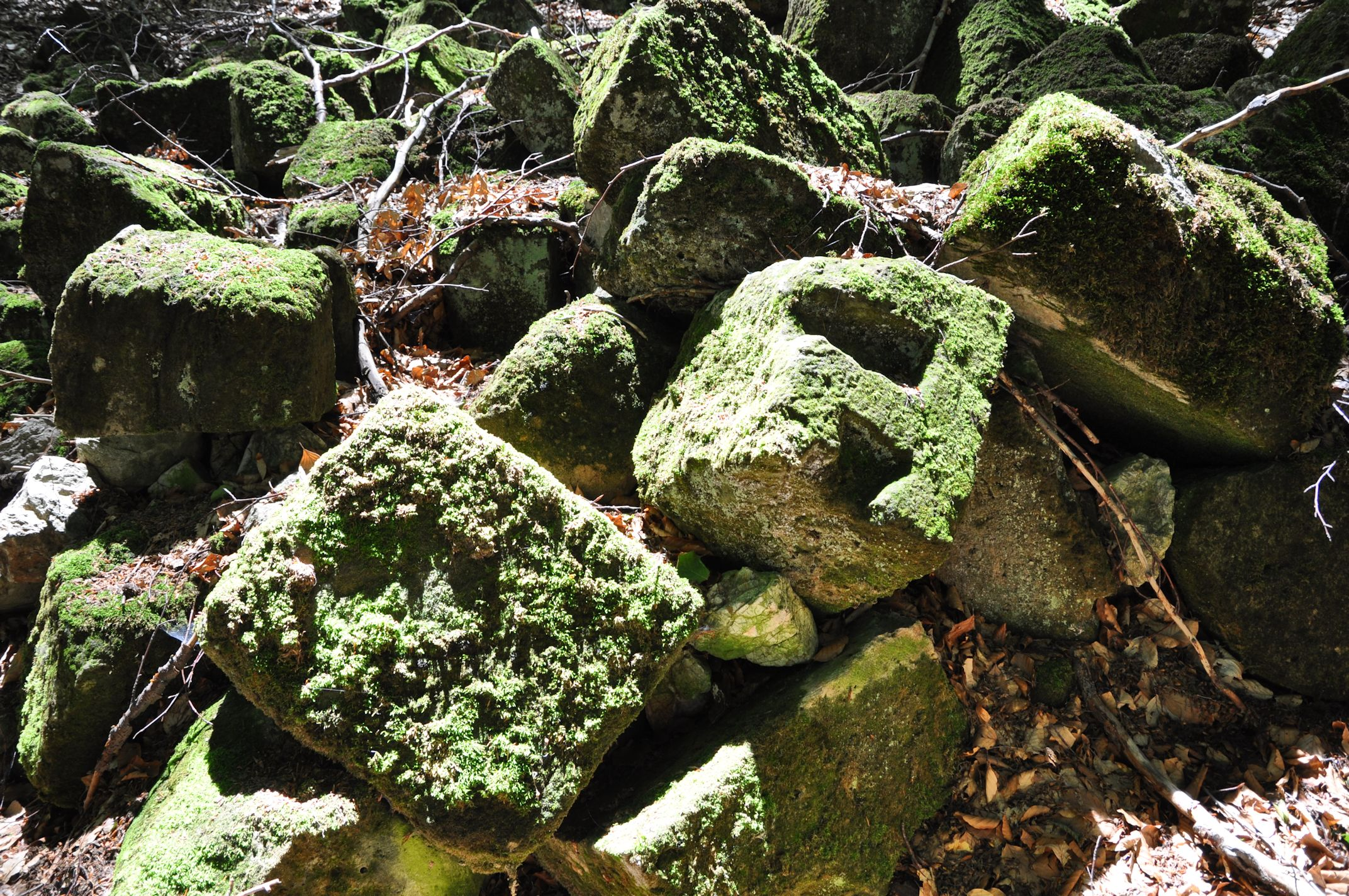
Fallen blocks

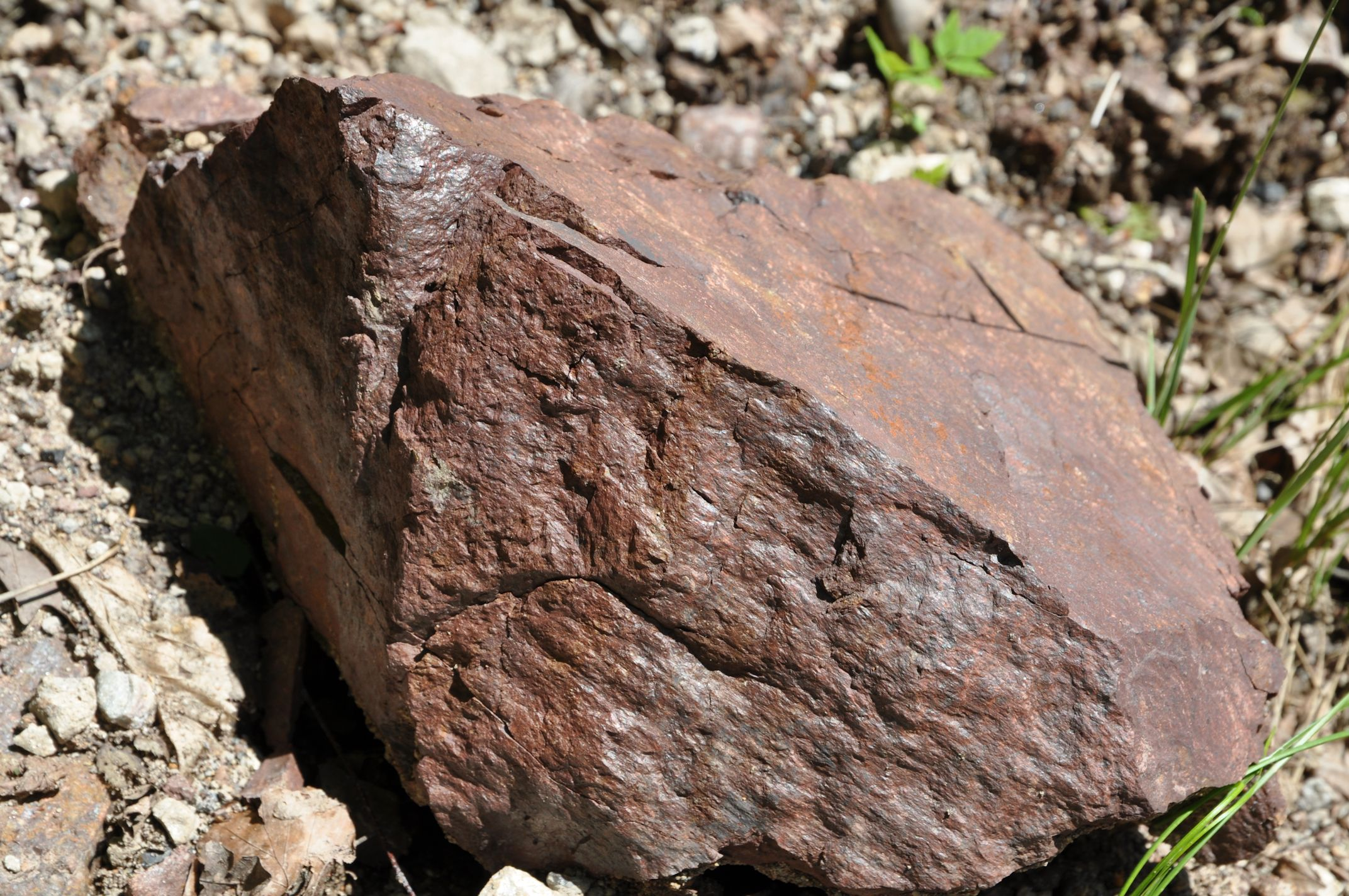
Red rock

Fortress plan

== Artefacts ==
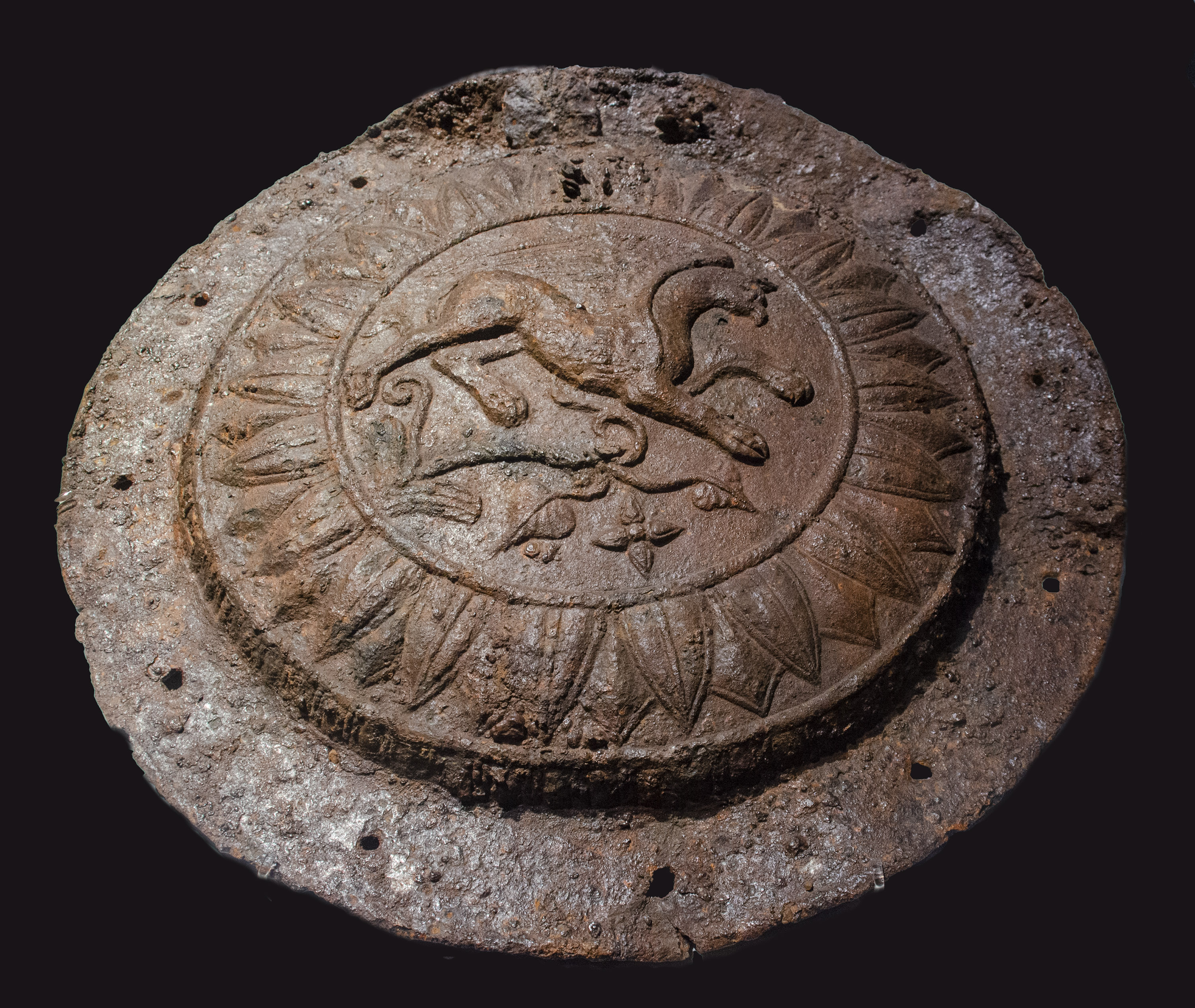
Dacian artefact from site.

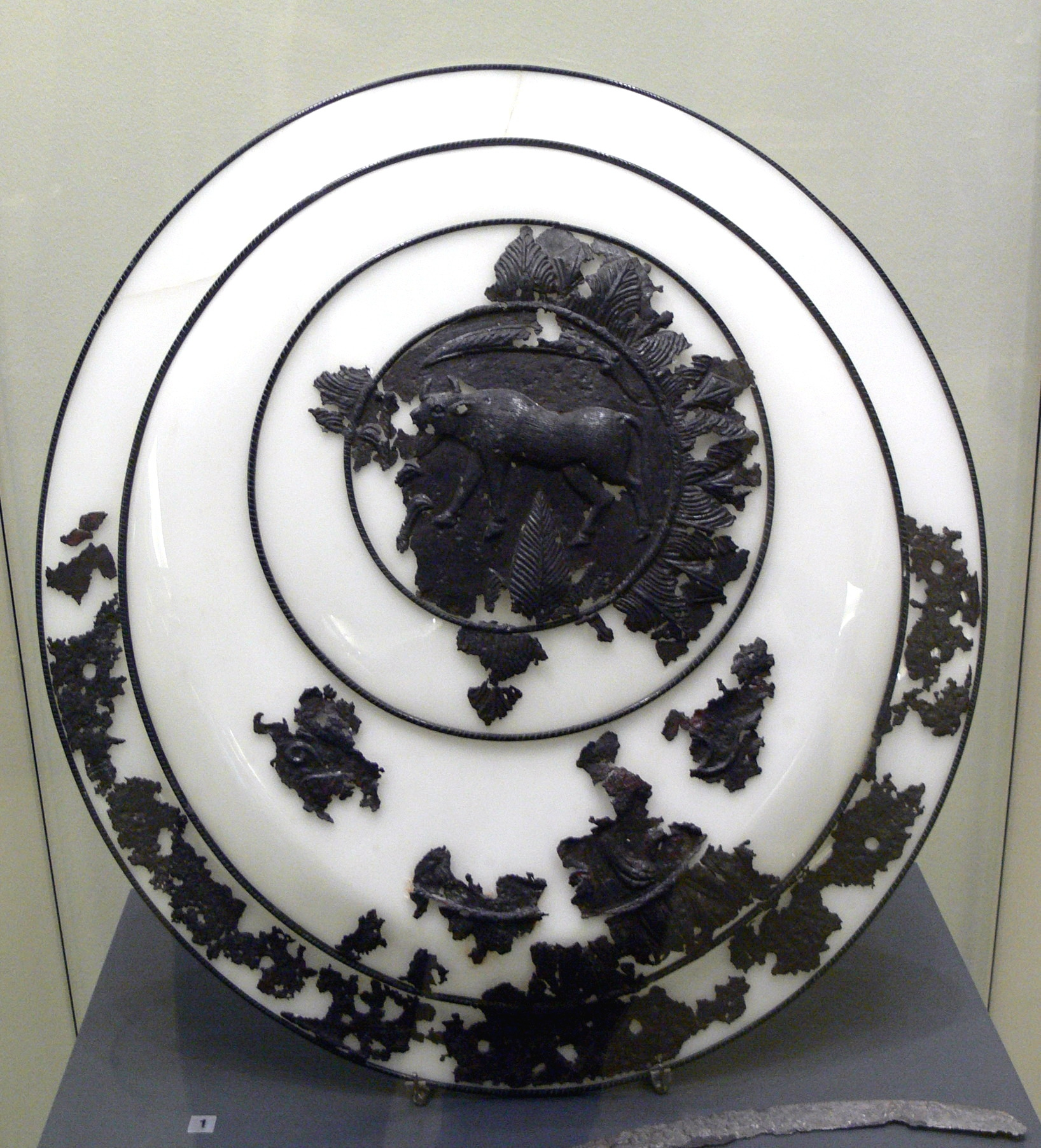
Dacian shield (1st century BC) found on site – on display in the Roman Museum Manching.

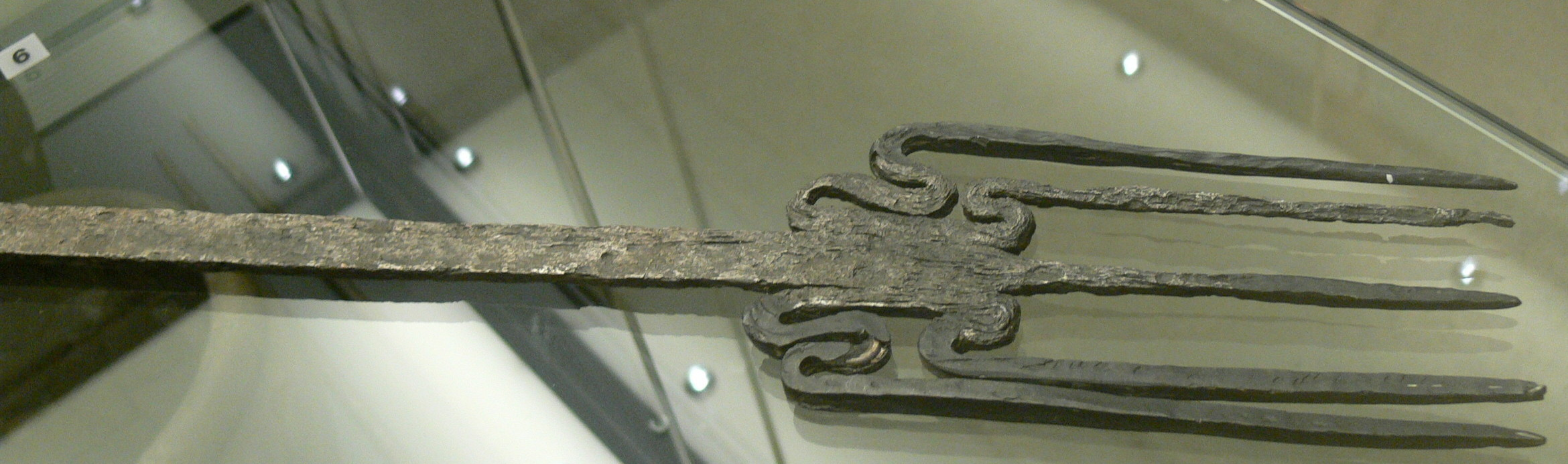
Dacian roasting spit (1st century BC) found on site – on display in the Roman Museum Manching.
