= Dacian fortress of Bănița =

- Location within Romania
- 45.4517°N 23.3135°E
- Location: Piatra Cetăţii, Cetatea de pe Dealul Bolii, Bănița, Hunedoara, Romania

History
- Event: Trajan's Dacian Wars

Site notes
- Elevation: 902 m (2,959 ft)
- Condition: Ruined

Monument istoric
- Reference no.: HD-I-s-A-03156

UNESCO World Heritage Site
- Part of: Dacian Fortresses of the Orăștie Mountains
- Criteria: Cultural: (ii), (iii), (iv)
- Reference: 906
- Inscription: 1999 (23rd Session)

Dacian fortress of Bănița is one of the six Dacian Fortresses of the Orăștie Mountains, in Romania. Together with the other Dacian fortresses in the area, it was designated as a UNESCO World Heritage Site in 1999.

== Gallery ==
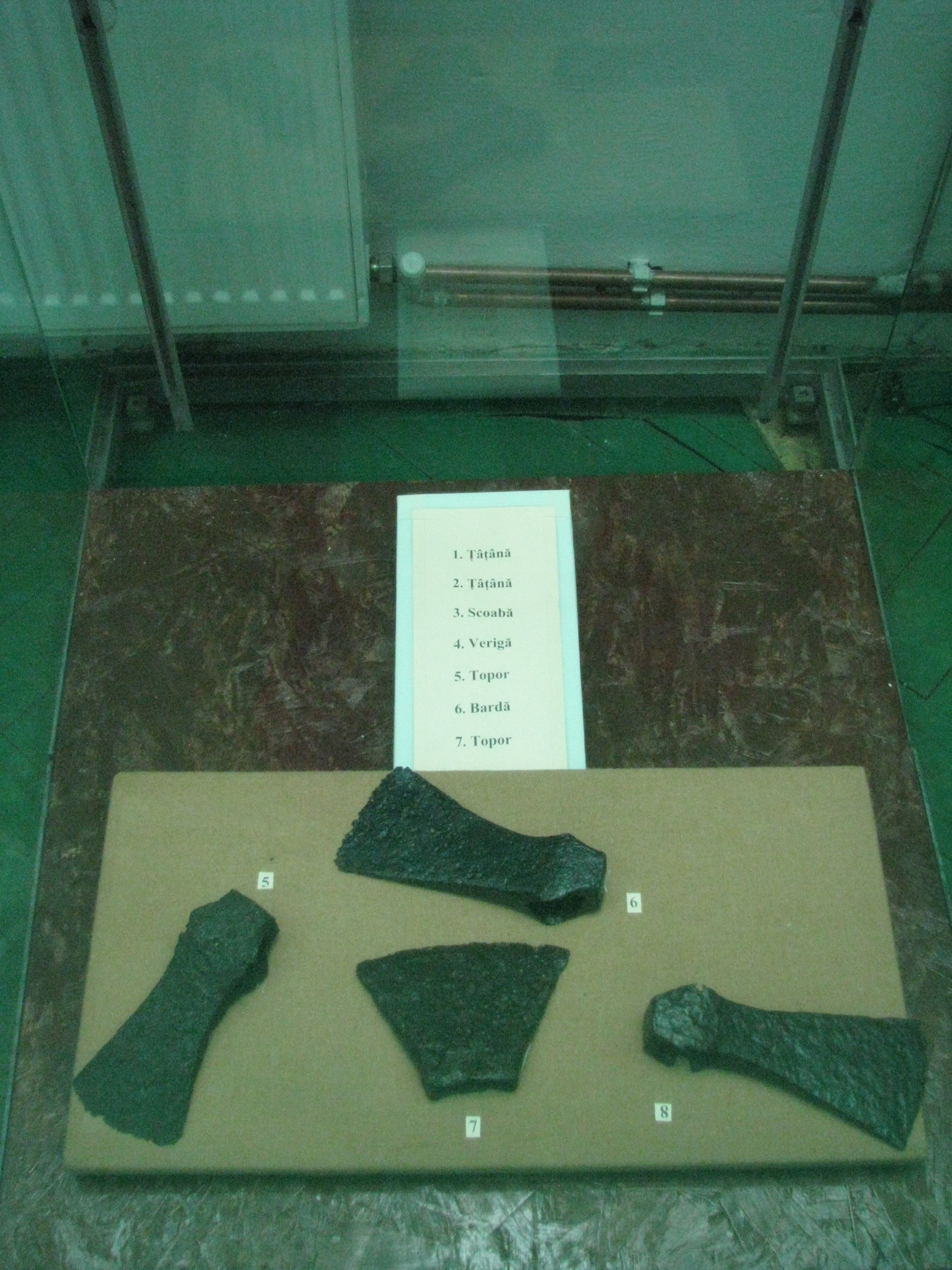
Axes and hatchet from the Dacian fortress of Bănița at Orăștie Ethnography Museum

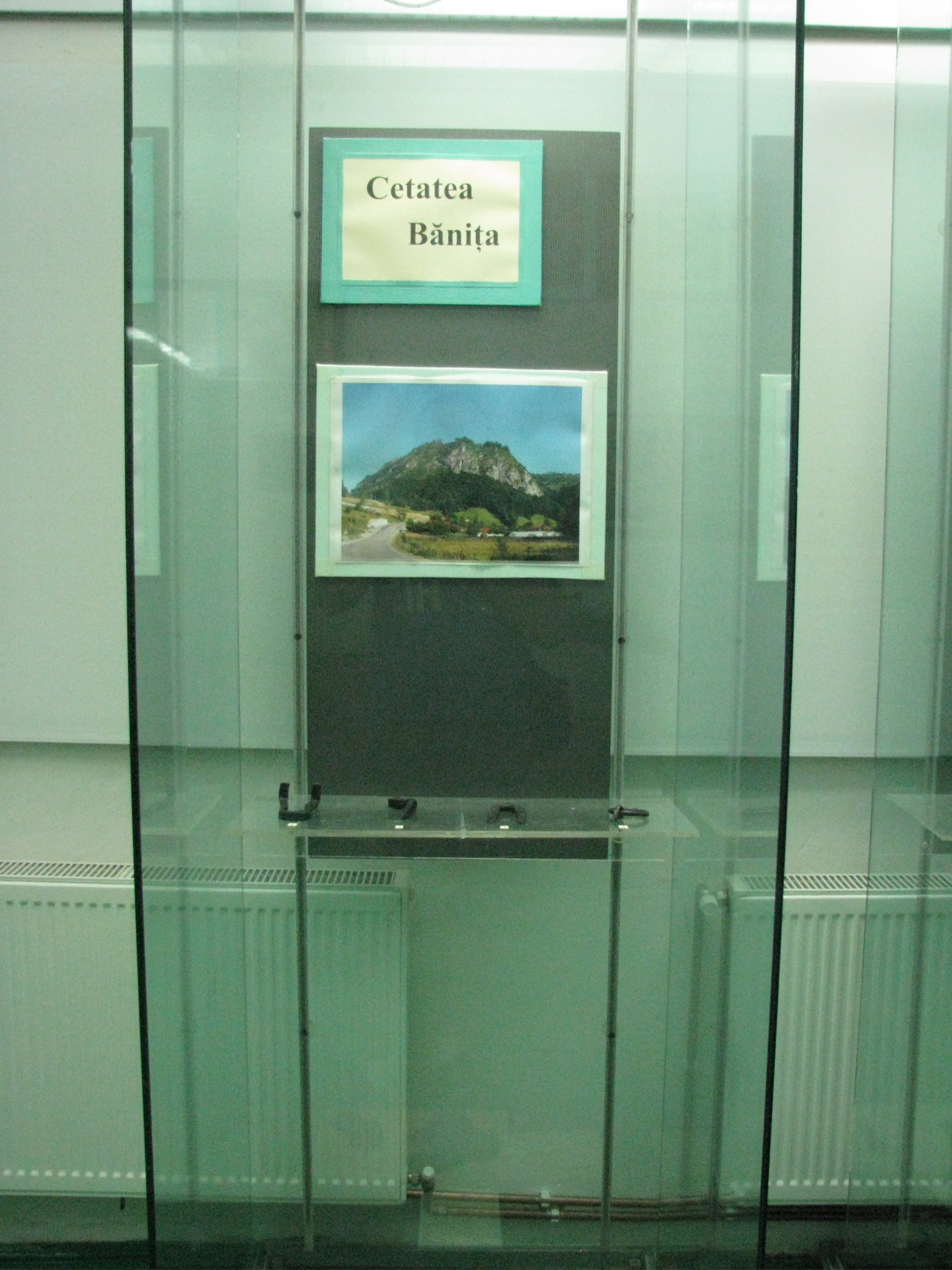
Hinges, cramp Iron and chain link

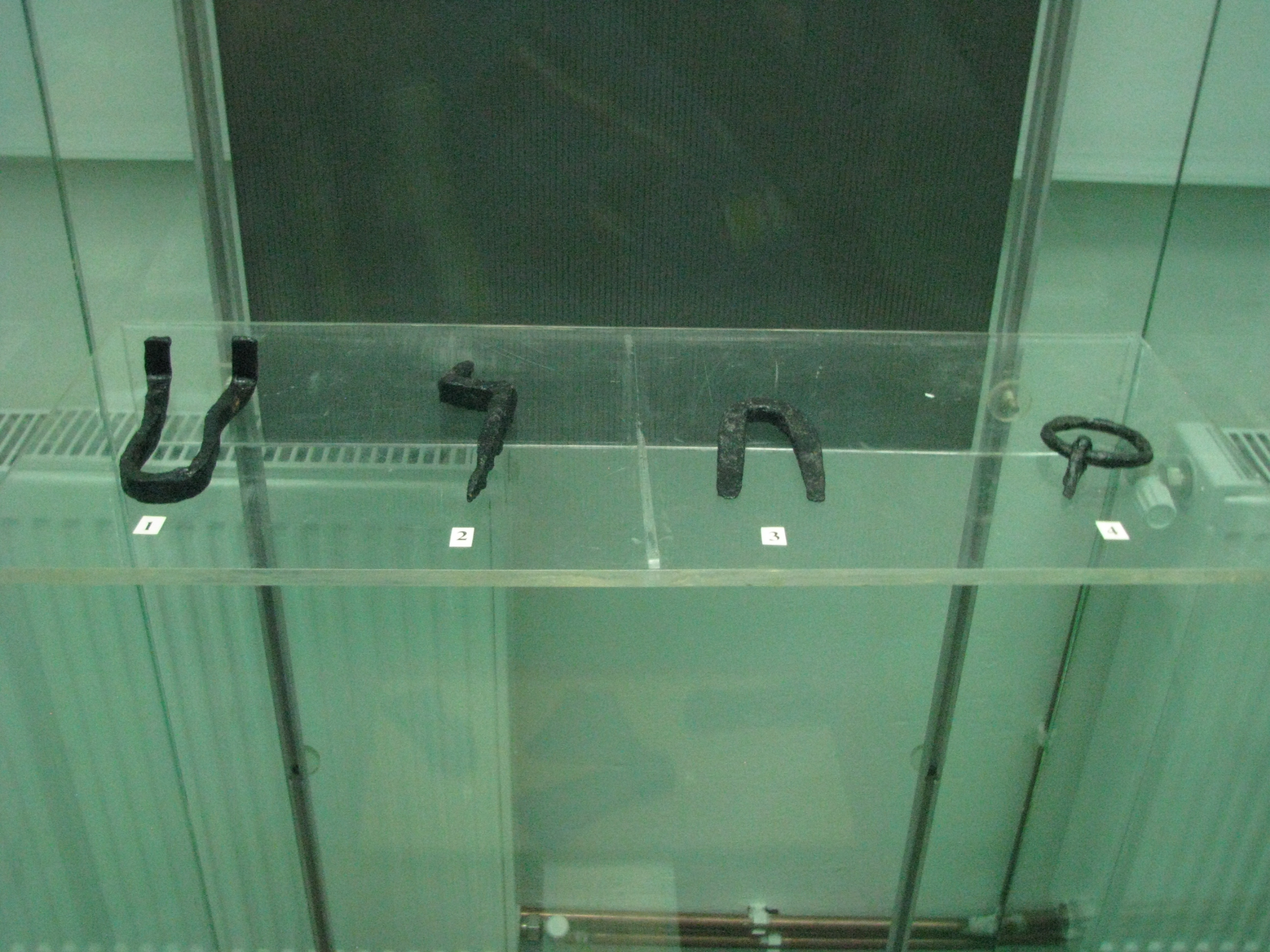
Hinges, cramp Iron and chain link - close up

== See also ==
- Dacia
- Burebista
- Trajan's Dacian Wars
