= Costești-Blidaru Dacian fortress =

Fortress in Romania

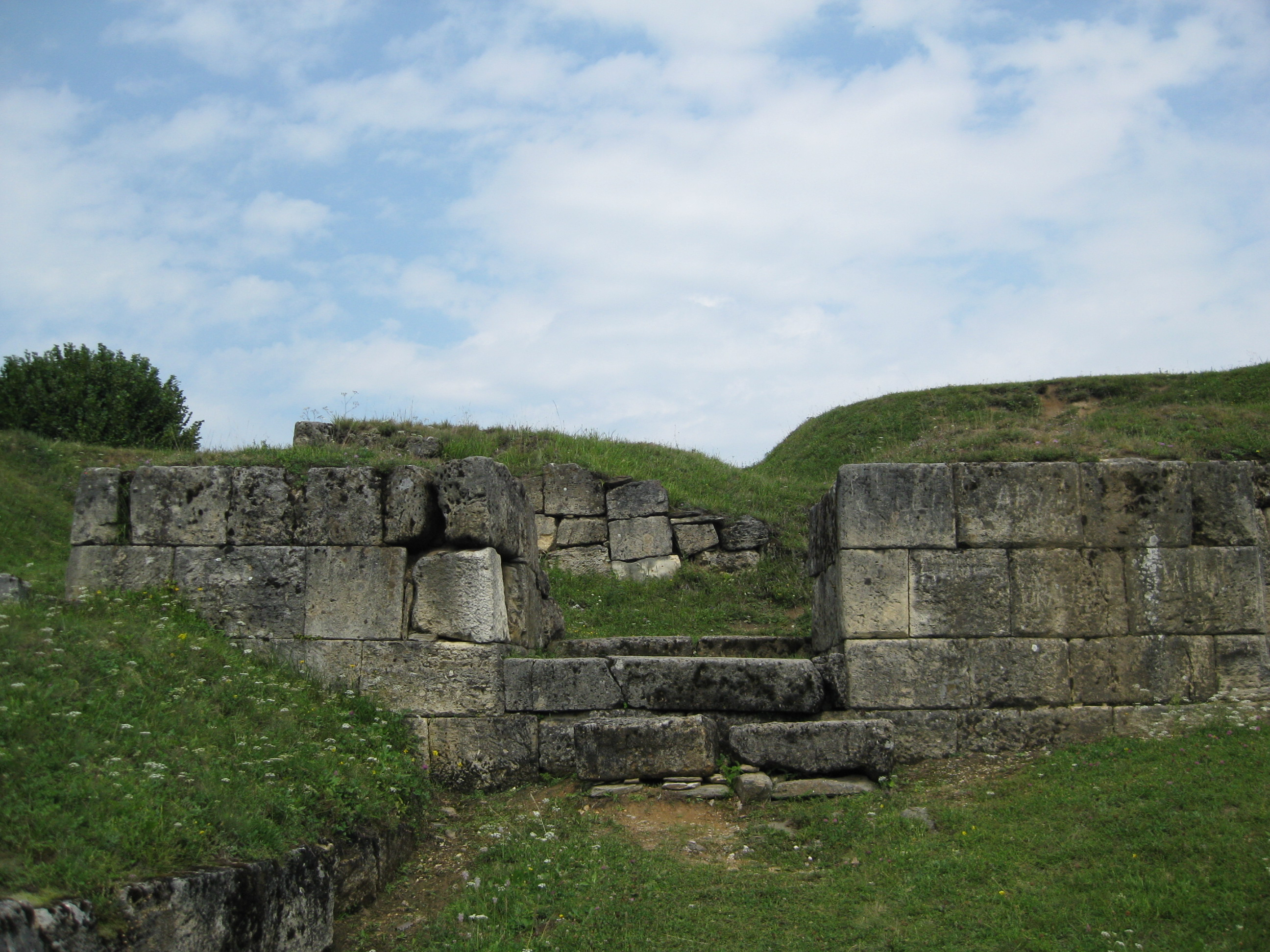
- Gate tower

- Location within Romania
- 45.667785°N 23.162786°E
- Location: Blidaru, Costești, Romania

History
- Event: Trajan's Dacian Wars

Site notes
- Elevation: 750 m (2,460 ft)
- Condition: Ruined

Monument istoric
- Reference no.: HD-I-s-A-03181

UNESCO World Heritage Site
- Part of: Dacian Fortresses of the Orăștie Mountains
- Criteria: Cultural: (ii), (iii), (iv)
- Reference: 906
- Inscription: 1999 (23rd Session)

The Costești-Blidaru Dacian fortress is the ruin of a Dacian fortified town in present-day Romania. Located near Costești village in Hunedoara County, it belongs to the Dacian Fortresses of the Orăștie Mountains World Heritage Site. The fortress was built in the 1st century BC, during Burebista's rule, with the purpose of defending the area against the Romans.

== Gallery ==
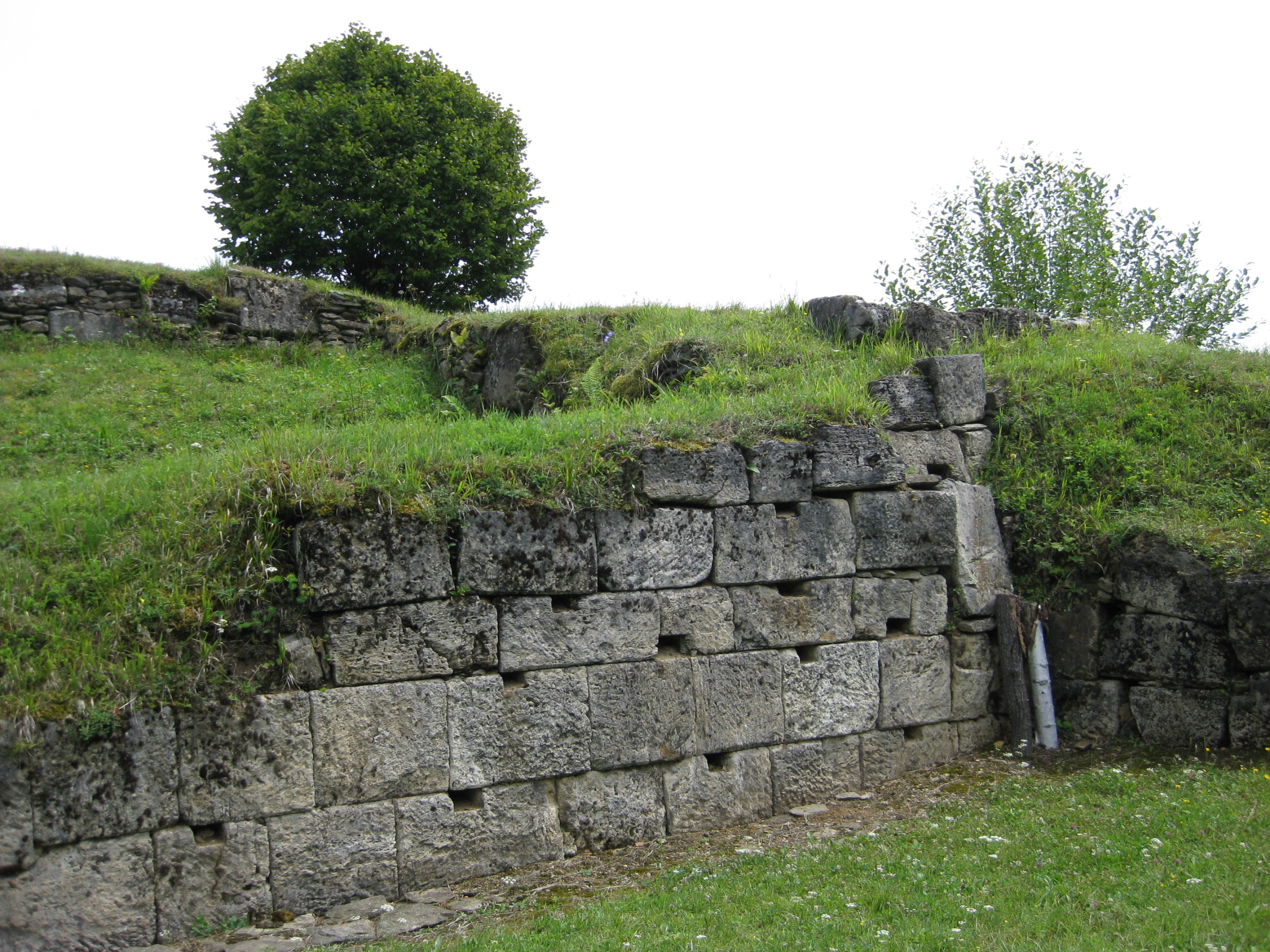

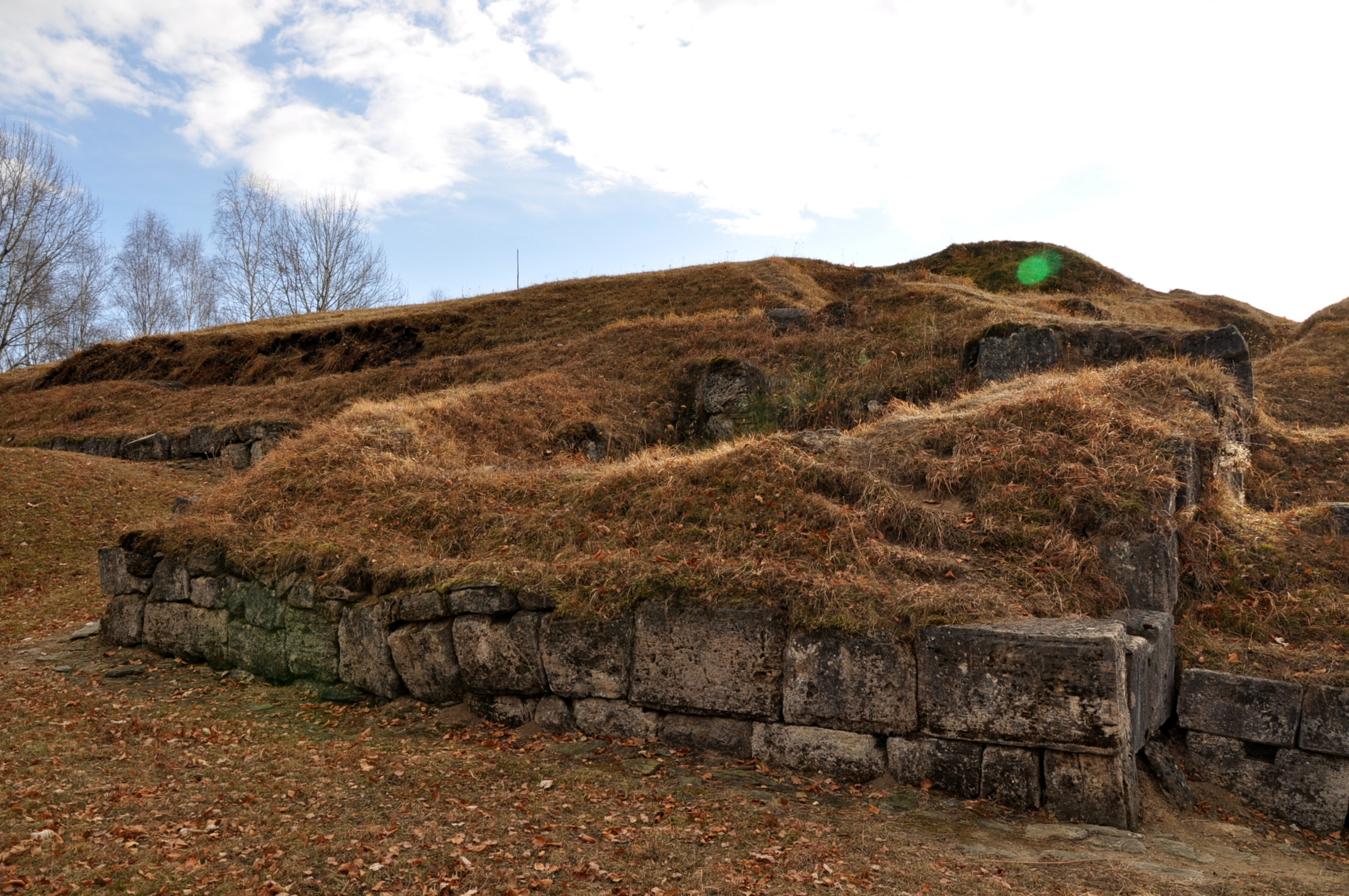

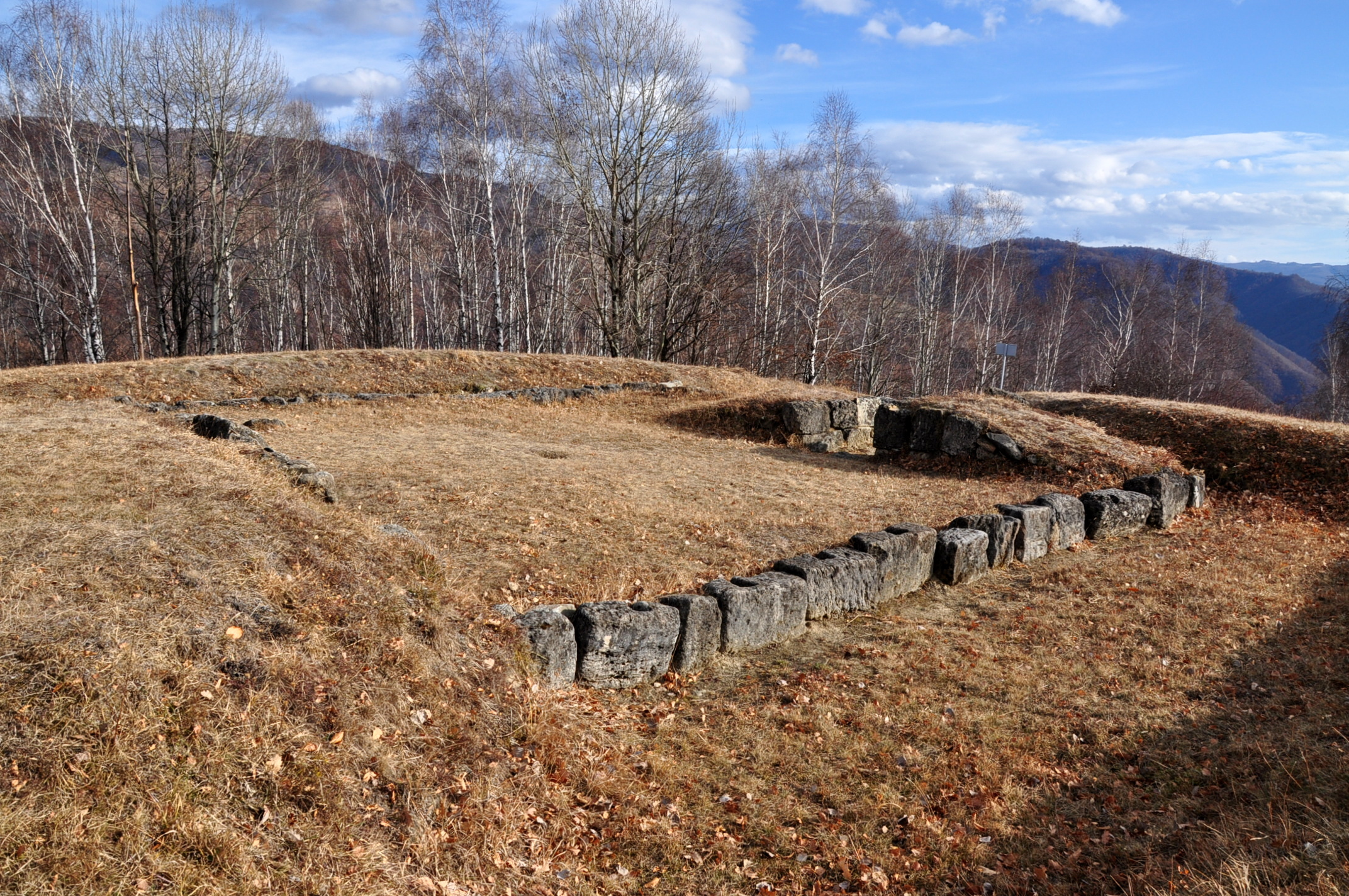

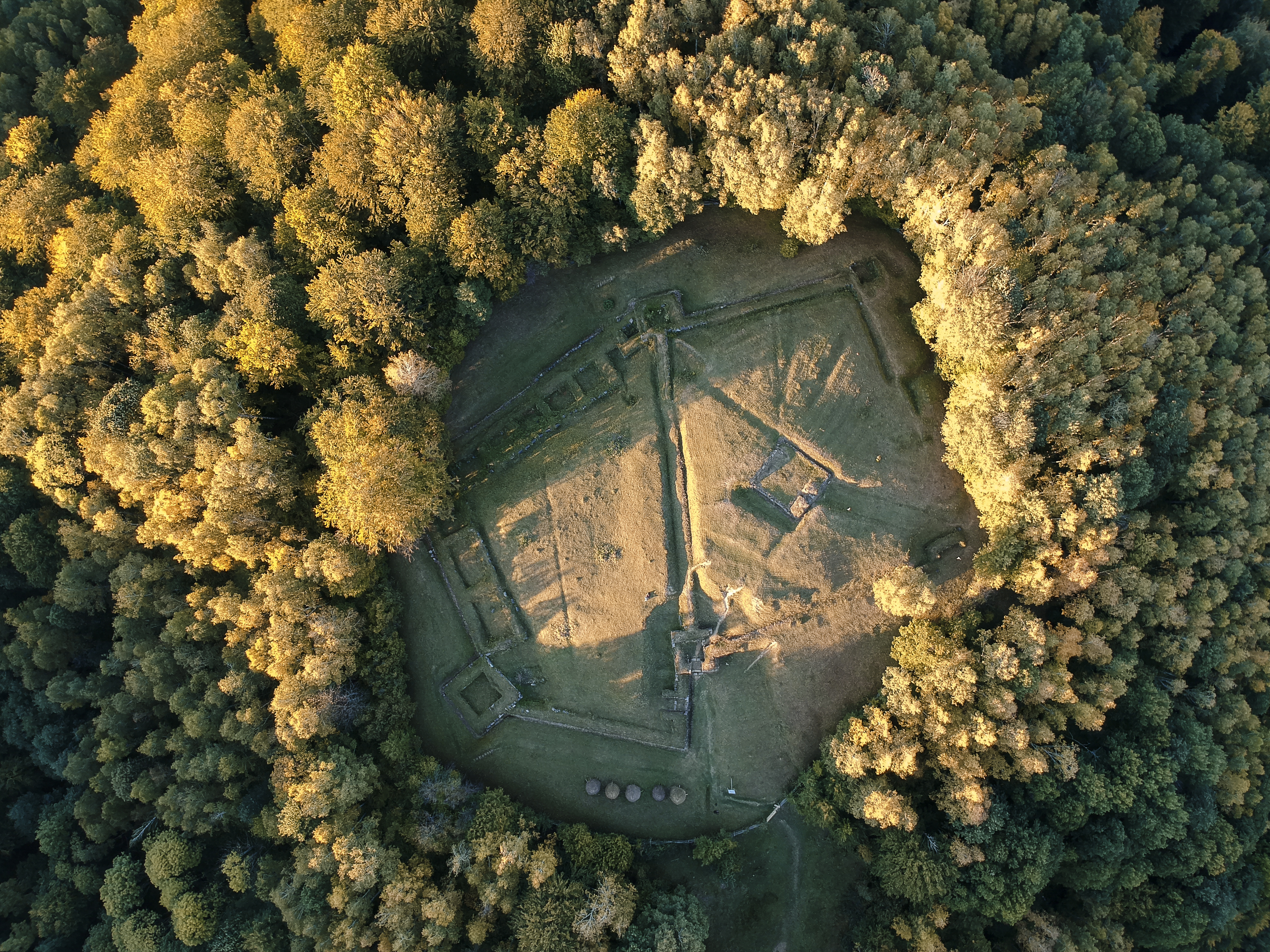

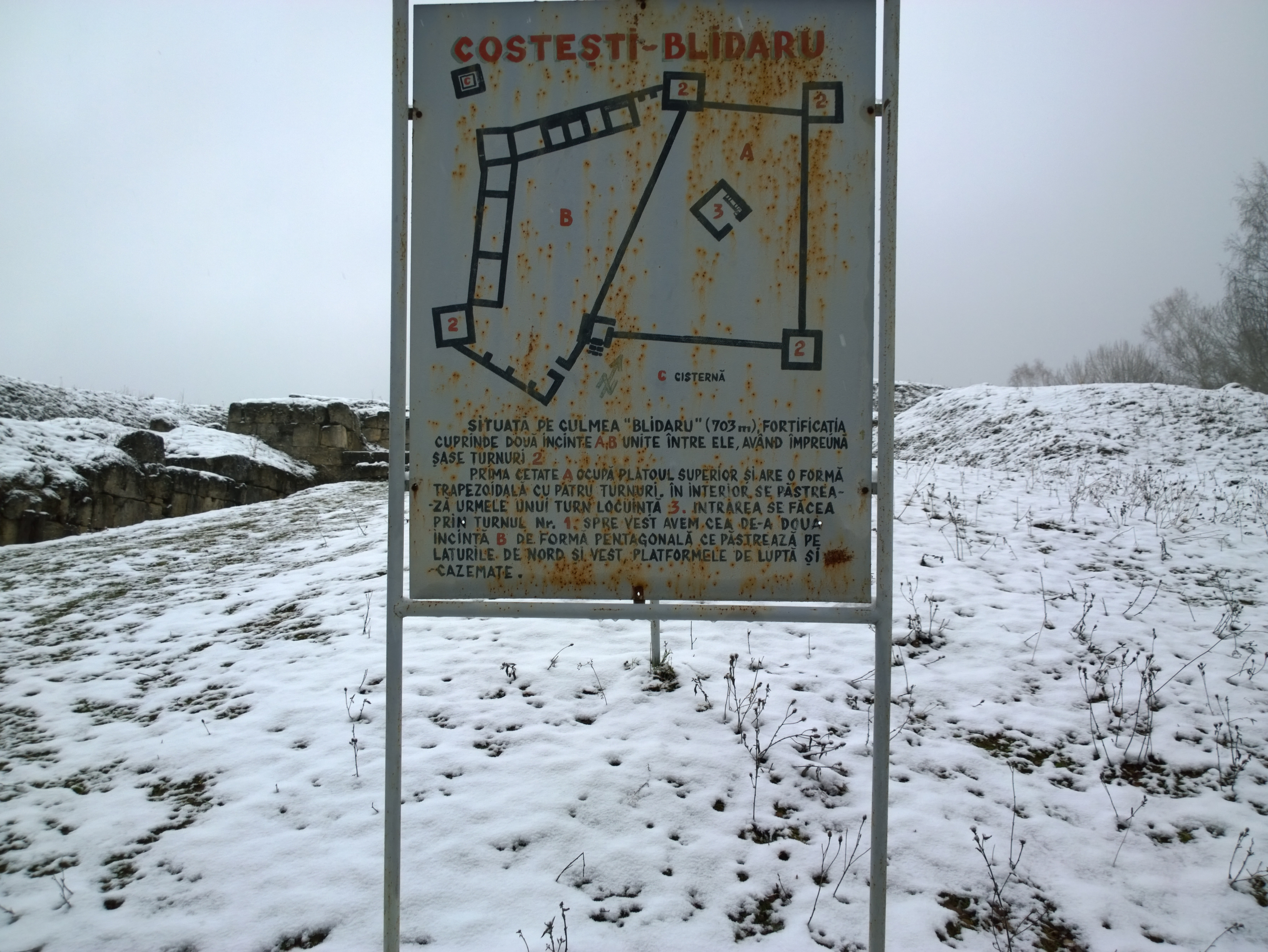
