= Costești-Cetățuie Dacian fortress =

- Cetatea Dacică Costești-Cetățuie
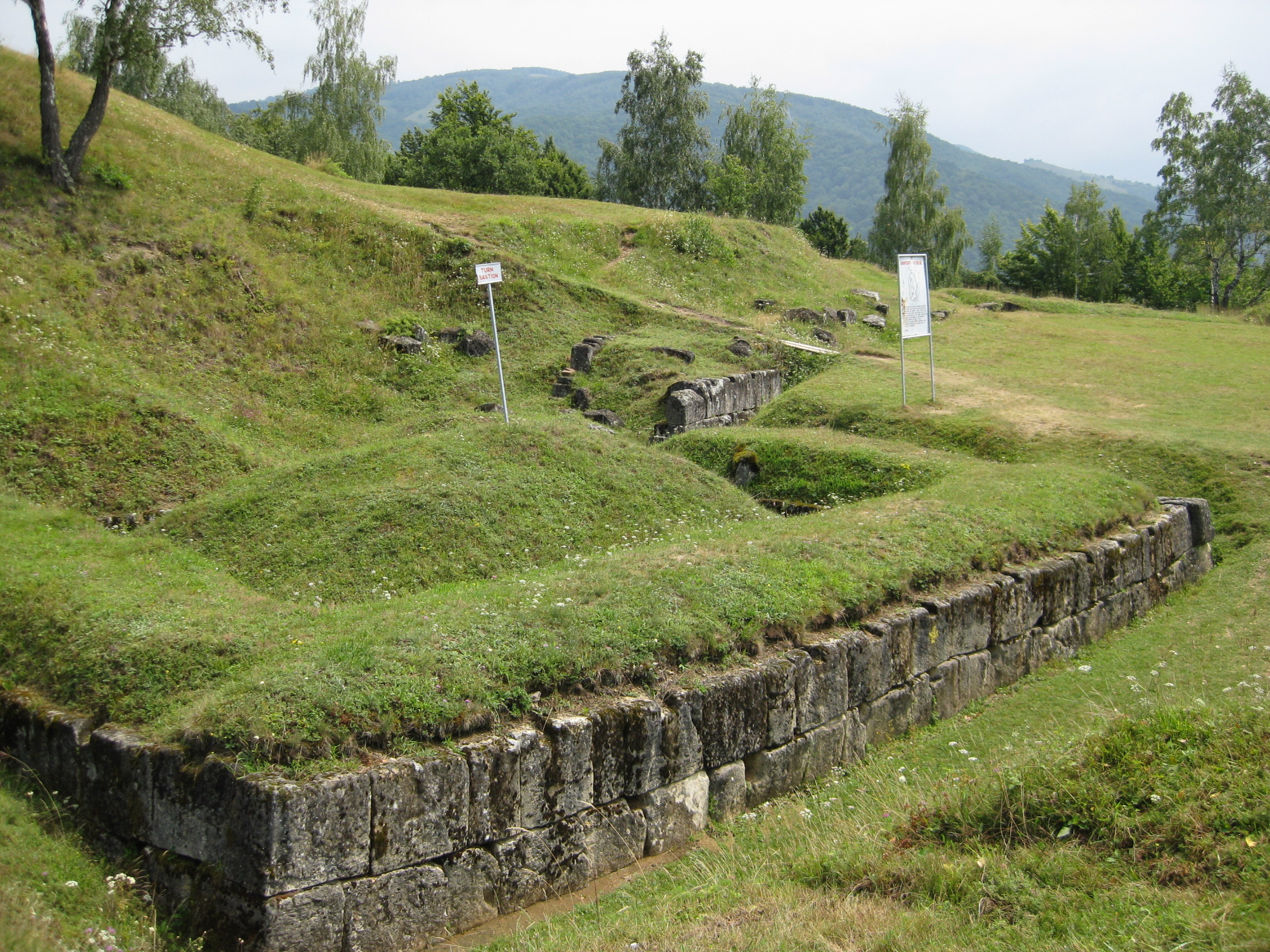

- Location within Romania
- 45.680189°N 23.154285°E
- Cultures: Dacian
- Location: Cetățuie, Costești, Hunedoara, Romania

History
- Built: 1st century BC
- Abandoned: 2nd century AD
- Event: Trajan's Dacian Wars

Site notes
- Elevation: 514 m (1,686 ft)
- Area: Hunedoara County
- Condition: Ruined

Monument istoric
- Reference no.: HD-I-s-A-03177

UNESCO World Heritage Site
- Part of: Dacian Fortresses of the Orăștie Mountains
- Criteria: Cultural: (ii), (iii), (iv)
- Reference: 906
- Inscription: 1999 (23rd Session)

The Costești-Cetățuie Dacian fortress was a Dacian fortified town. Located near Costești village, Hunedoara County, Romania, it belongs to the Dacian Fortresses of the Orăștie Mountains World Heritage Site. The fortress was built in the 1st century BC, during Burebista's rule, with the purpose of defending the area against the Romans.

== Information about the fortress ==
The site is located in the river valley of Apa Grădiștei. The superior plateau of the hill where it is situated is 514 m above sea level. It was a strong fortress which had a defensive role. Apparently, it had a civilian settlement at the base and it was the regular residence of the Dacian kings. Another important role was the guarding of the road to Sarmizegetusa Regia.

== Gallery ==
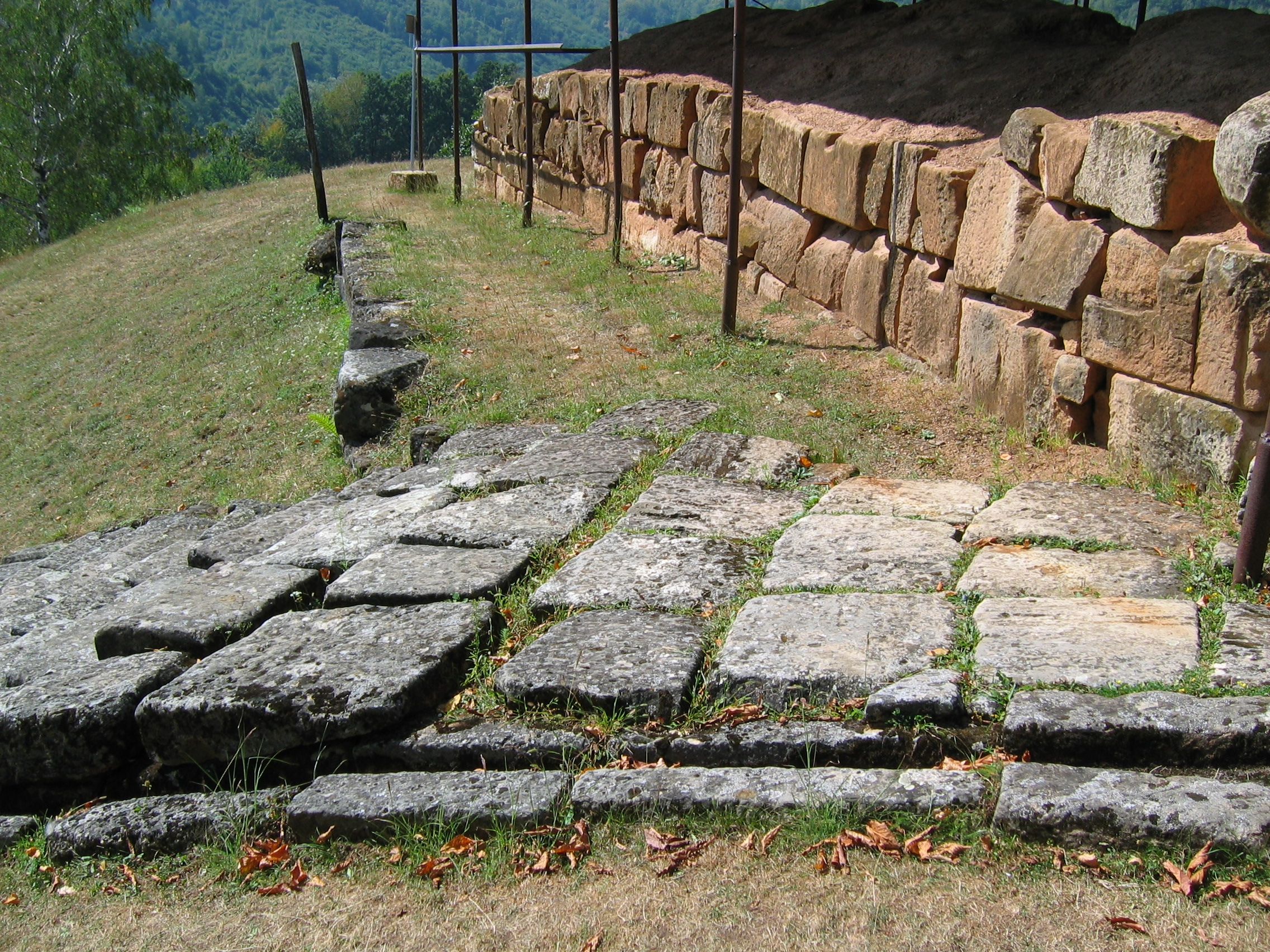
Tower house

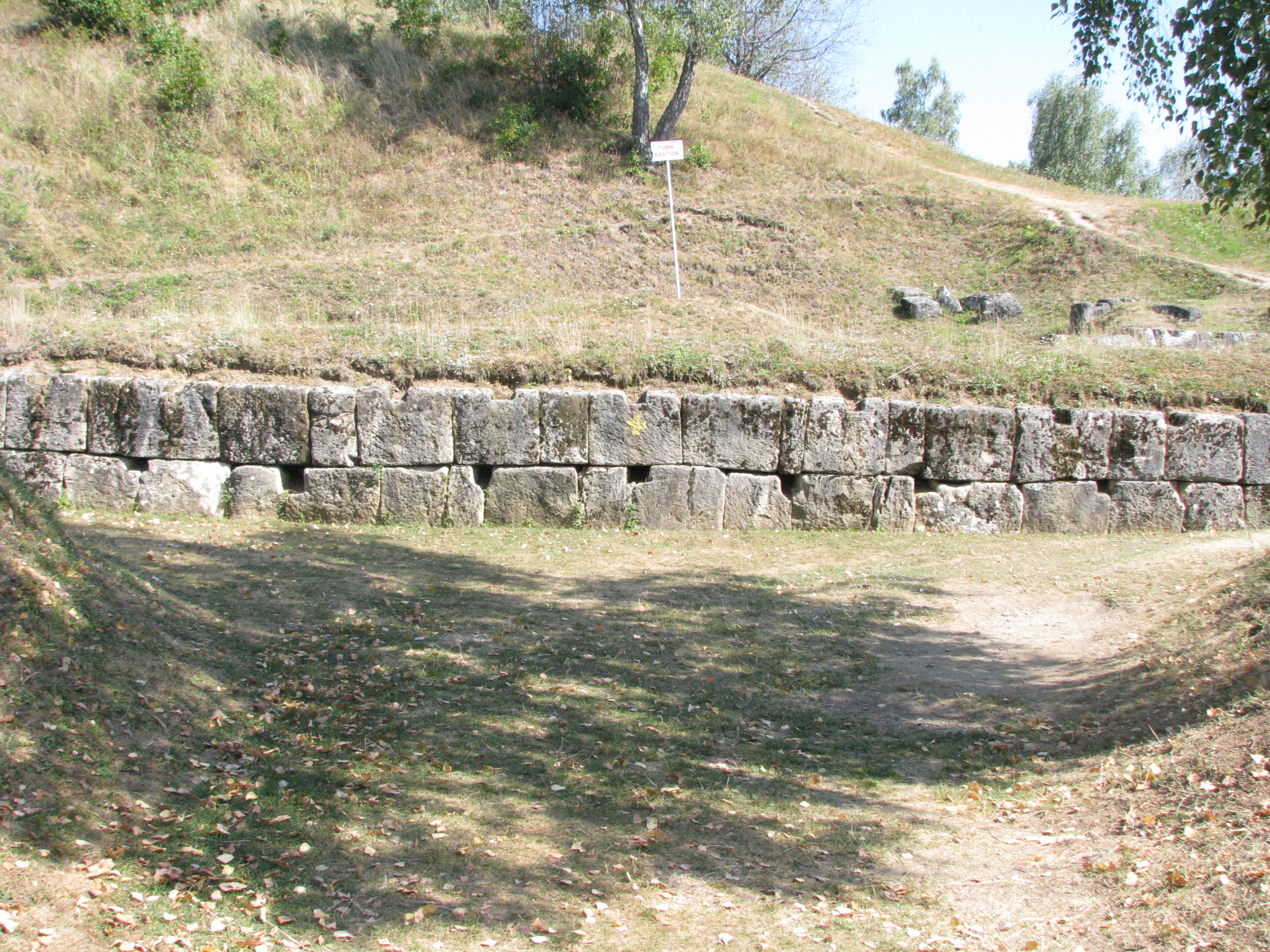
Bastion tower

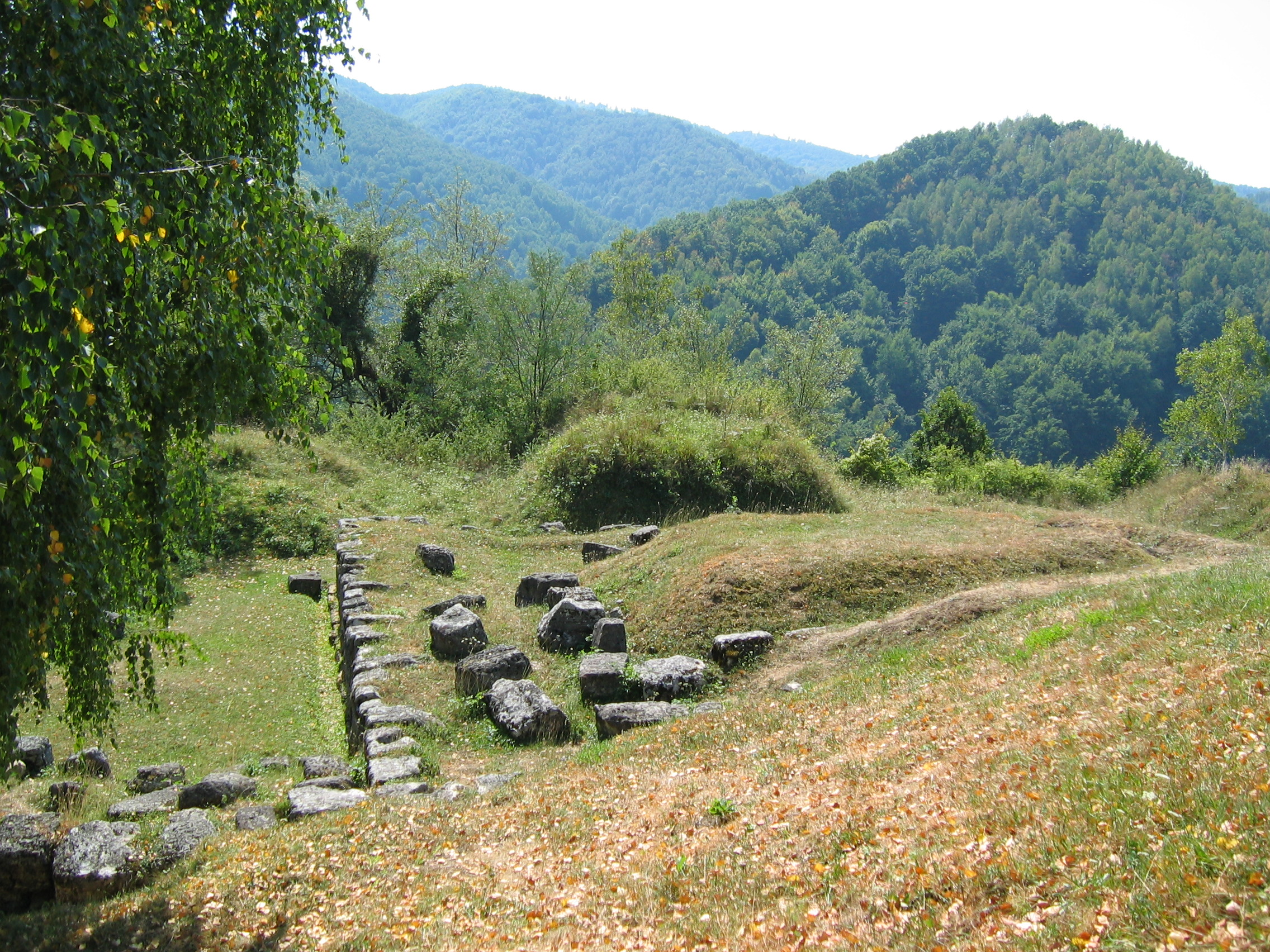
Bastion tower

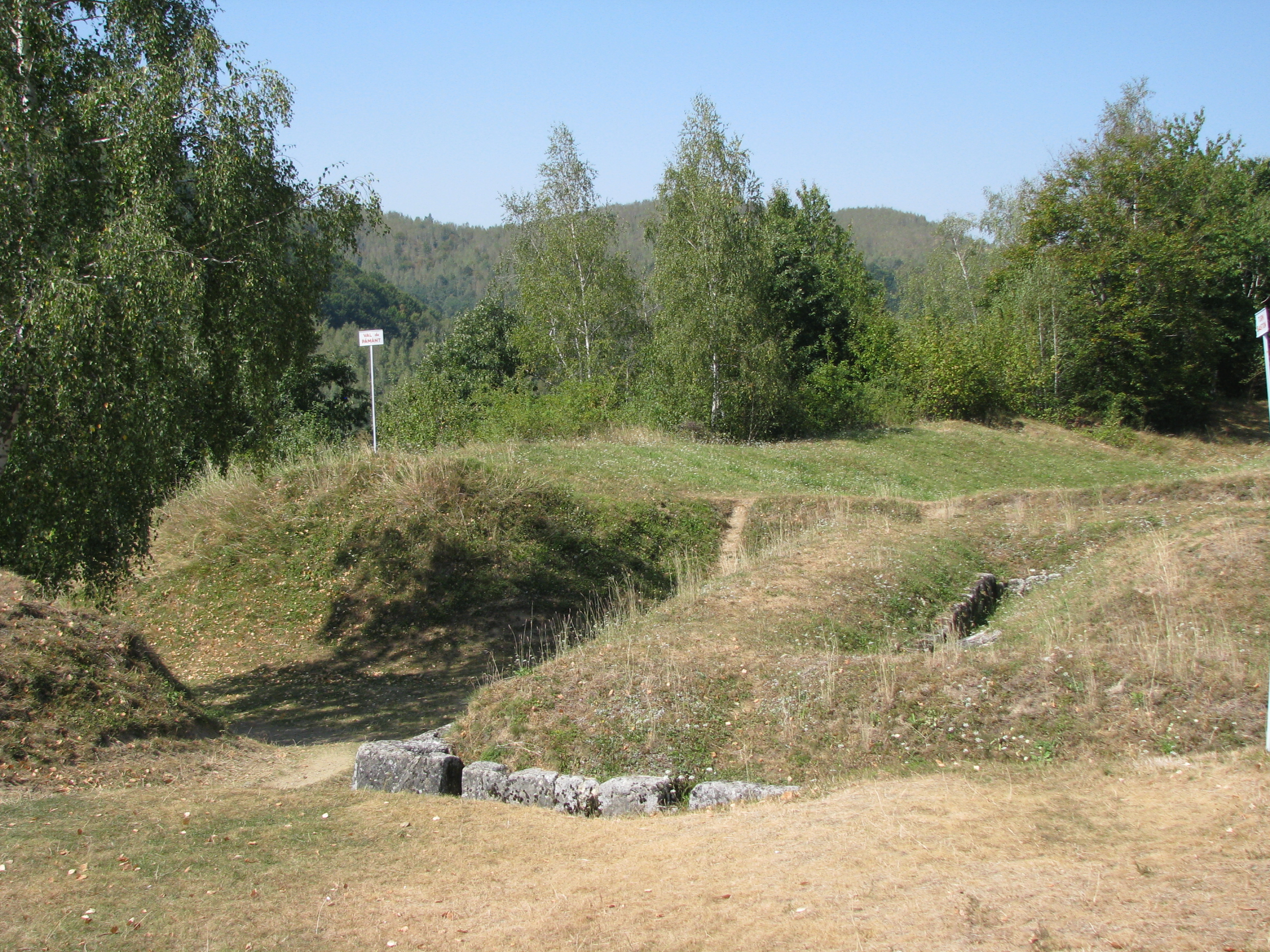
Vallum
