= Boșorod =

- Commune
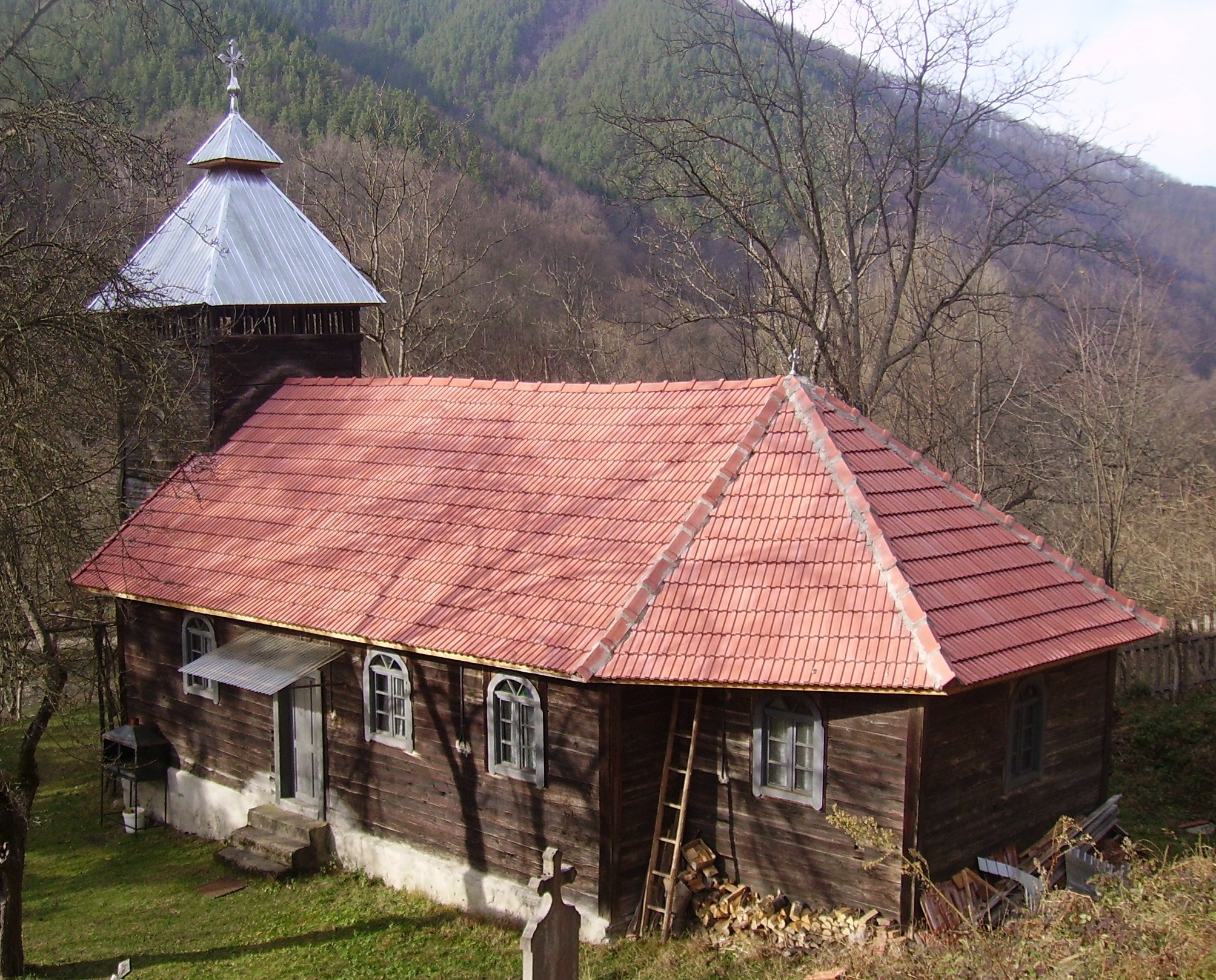
- Wooden church in Luncani

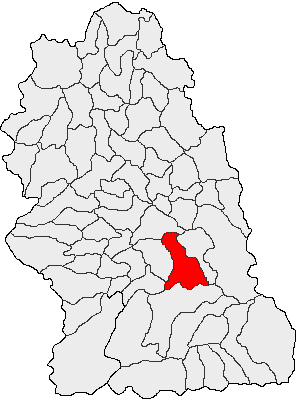
- Location in Hunedoara County

- Location in Romania
- Coordinates: 45°41′N 23°5′E
- Country: Romania
- County: Hunedoara

Government
  - Mayor (2024–2028): Denis-Ovidiu Perța (PSD)
- Area: 126.77 km^{2} (48.95 sq mi)
- Elevation: 308 m (1,010 ft)
- Population (2021-12-01): 1,781
  - Density: 14.05/km^{2} (36.39/sq mi)
- Time zone: UTC+02:00 (EET)
  - Summer (DST): UTC+03:00 (EEST)
- Postal code: 337095
- Area code: (+40) 02 54
- Vehicle reg.: HD
- Website: www.comunabosorod.ro

Boșorod (Hungarian: Bosoród, German: Bosendorf) is a commune in Hunedoara County, Transylvania, Romania. It is composed of nine villages: Alun, Bobaia (Bobája), Boșorod, Chitid (Kitid), Cioclovina (Csoklovina), Luncani (Lunkány), Prihodiște (Prihodest), Târsa, and Ursici.

Piatra Roșie Dacian fortress is located near Luncani village.

Historical population
Year	Pop.	±%
1850	2,550	—
1910	3,535	+38.6%
2002	2,257	−36.2%
2011	2,062	−8.6%
2021	1,781	−13.6%
Source: Census data

At the 2021 census, the commune had a population of 1,781, of which 96.18% were Romanians.
