= List of reconstructed Dacian words =

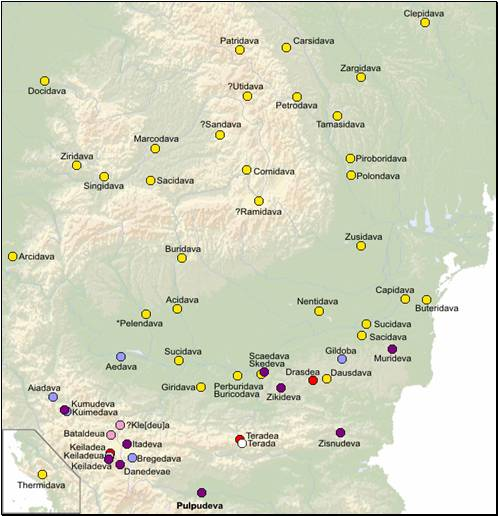
Map of the geographical distribution of attested placenames with the -dava suffix, a Dacian word meaning "settlement" or "fort."

This article contains a list of reconstructed words of the ancient Dacian language. They have been restored by some linguists from attested place and personal names (toponyms and anthroponyms) from the historical region of Dacia.

In the case of words reconstructed from onomastic evidence, the original meanings ascribed to the names in question are derived from examination of closely cognate words and placenames in other Indo-European languages, complemented by analysis of the historical evolution of such placenames. However, the results are hypothetical and subject, in many cases, to divergent etymological interpretations.

Reconstructions derived from Romanian and Albanian words that have not been attested to be Dacian or that have not been documented in Dacian territory are speculatively based on the unproven theory that Dacian constitutes the main linguistic substratum of Romanian and a closely related language to Albanian, a circular method criticised by mainstream historical linguistics.

== Reconstruction of words from place and personal names ==
=== Methodology ===
Both Georgiev and Duridanov use the comparative linguistic method to decipher ancient Thracian and Dacian names, respectively.

Georgiev argues that one can reliably decipher the meaning of an ancient place-name in an unknown language by comparing it to its successor-names and to cognate place-names and words in other IE languages, both ancient and modern. He gives several examples of his methodology, of which one is summarised here:

The city and river (a tributary of the Danube) in eastern Romania called Cernavodă. In Slavic, the name means "black water". The same town in Antiquity was known as Άξίοπα (Axiopa) or Άξιούπολις (Axioupolis) and its river as the Άξιος (Axios). The working assumption is, therefore, that Axiopa means "black water" in Dacian. According to the known rules of formation of IE composite words, this breaks down as axi = "black" and opa or upa = "water" in Dacian (the -polis element is ignored, as it is a Greek suffix meaning "city"). The assumption is then validated by examining cognate placenames. The axi element is validated by a tributary of the Vardar called the Axios, which is today known as Crna reka (located in Republic of Macedonia "black river") and by the older Greek name for the Black Sea, Άξεινος πόντος (Axeinos pontos, later altered to the euphemism Euxeinos pontos = "Hospitable sea"). The opa/upa element is validated by the Lithuanian cognate upė ("river"). This etymology is questioned by Russu: Axiopa, a name attested only in Procopius' De Aedificiis, may be a corrupt form of Axiopolis. Even if correct, however, Russu's objection does not invalidate the decipherment of the axi- element.

Apart from Duridanov and Georgiev, other scholars have attempted to reconstruct Dacian and Thracian words. Russu (1967) attempted to decipher Thracian and Dacian onomastic elements (placenames and personal names) by reference to presumed proto-Indo-European roots-words. Georgiev considers such a methodology (known as Wurzeletymologien = "root-etymologies") to be "devoid of scientific value". This is because the root-words themselves are reconstructions, which are in some cases disputed and in all cases subject to uncertainty; multiple root-words can often explain the same word; and the list of proposed IE root-words may not be complete. Reichenkron (1966) assumed that so-called "substratum" words in Romanian (those whose etymology cannot be ascribed to any of the fully documented languages that have influenced Romanian: Latin, Slavic, Hungarian, Greek, Turkish etc.) are of Dacian origin. But Polomé considers that such a methodology is not reliable. This is because there is no guarantee that the substratum words are, in fact, Dacian. Instead, they could derive from other, unknown or little-known tongues at some period current in Dacia or Moesia: for example, possible pre-Indo-European language(s) of the Carpathians.

=== Methodological problems ===
The methodology used by Georgiev and Duridanov has been questioned on a number of grounds, including:

1. The phonetic systems of Dacian and Thracian and their evolution are not reconstructed from elements derived directly from the ancient languages in question but from their approximative Greek and Latin transcripts. For example, Greek and Latin had no dedicated graphic signs for phonemes such as č, ġ, ž, š and others. Thus, if a Thracian or Dacian word contained such a phoneme, a Greek or Latin transcript would not represent it accurately. This could result in the wrong cognate being selected to decipher the Dacian name.
2. The etymologies that are adduced to validate the proposed Dacian and Thracian vowel- and consonant- changes (that are, in turn, used for word-reconstruction by the comparative method) are open to divergent interpretations, since the material is strictly onomastic, with the exception of Dacian plant-names and of the limited number of glosses. Because of this, there are divergent and even contradictory assumptions for the phonological structure and development of the Dacian and Thracian languages. Polomé (1982) notes that, in the case of personal names, the choice of etymology is often based on such assumed phonological rules.
3. Dana argues that both Georgiev and Duridanov ignore the context of the names and start from arbitrary assumptions, such as considering a name to be of Dacian origin simply because it is attested in Dacia. In Dana's opinion, the Dacian origin of some of the names is doubtful or even excluded. Also, Duridanov's method is unreliable because most of the names he considers are unique.
4. Dana questions the validity of the Baltic etymologies used to decipher the Dacian names.
5. According to Messing, Duridanov's results are in contradiction with the reconstruction of a Balto-Slavic language group, as they show many parallels between Dacian and Baltic, but only a few with Slavic languages. (This objection is irrelevant if Baltic and Slavic constitute separate branches of IE (i.e. "Balto-Slavic" never existed, as some linguists maintain); or if, as Duridanov argues, Dacian acquired Baltic words through long-term proximity interaction with Baltic languages, rather than through a genetic link).

Despite these objections, Georgiev and Duridanov claim a high degree of reliability for their reconstructions. However, Polomé (1982), in his survey of the state of research into paleo-Balkan languages for Cambridge Ancient History, considers that only "20–25 Dacian, and 40–45 Thracian words have had reasonable, but not certain, Indo-European etymologies proposed". This compares with c. 100 Dacian words reconstructed by Duridanov, and c. 200 Thracian words by Georgiev.

== Reconstructed Dacian words ==
Key

- PN: placename
- RN: river name
- PRN: personal name
- TN: tribal name
- LN: lake name
- SN: swamp name
- MN: mountain name
- FN: field name
- PLN: plant name

TABLE A: ATTESTED DACIAN WORDS (exc Dacian plant names)
Dacian word	Meaning	Attestation	Possible Indo-European root-word(s)	Ancient cognates	Modern cognates	Notes
dava	city, settlement	e.g. PN Rusidava	*dʰeh₁- ("to place")	Thrac. -deva ("settlement") Germanic dailą ("partition")	Bulg. dial ("partition") Lith. dailýti ("to divide")	City name examples: Thracian: Pulpudeva Dacian: Buridava
per	son (child)	inscription Decebal per Scorilo ("Decebal son of Scorilus")		Thrac. -por ("son of": PRN Mucapor = "son of Muka"); Iranic -pur (e.g. Shapur = "son of the king" Latin puer ("boy")	Alb. bir ("son"); Lith. bernas ("lad"), peras ("whelp"), Latv. bērns ("child"), Rom. prichindel ("small child")	
per	to beat, to defeat	inscription Decebal per Scorilo ("Decebal defeated Scorilus")	*per- ("fight, struggle, battle")	Sanskrit pṛt ("fight, battle") Khotanese parva ("fighters")	Bulg. pera ("to beat, to strike") Lith. peria ("to beat")	
-zila or -dila	plant, herb (bot.)	Dacian plant-names	*ǵʰelh₃- ("green")	Phrygian zelkia ("vegetable") Gaulish dula ("leaf")	Bulg. zele ("leafy green plant") Bulg. dzlak ("wild plant foliage") Lith. zelti ("to grow")	Per Georgiev, the suffixes -dela, -dil(l)a, -zila and -tilia indicate names of medicinal plants.

TABLE B: DACIAN WORDS RECONSTRUCTED FROM ANCIENT NAMES
Reconstructed Dacian word	Meaning	Attestation	Possible Indo-European root-word(s)	Ancient cognates (same meaning unless stated)	Modern cognates (same meaning unless stated)	Cognate placenames	Notes
*aba, apa	water, river	RN *Calabaeus, river in Scythia Minor; RN Apos	*h₂ep- ("body of water") *ab- ("water", "river") It derived from akwa (shift kw>p, gw>b)	Latin amnis (der.< arch. Latin *abnis), Old Persian ap- ("river")	Old Pr. apus ("spring") Bulg. vapa ("still body of water") Latv. upe ("river") Rom. apă ("water"), Alb. amë "river bed" also hap "opening" (< PAl *abnā)	Latv. RN Abava, Abula; Dac. RN Apos	In Dacian, "v" at the start of a word sounded like a "w" and was omitted in writing because there was no assigned letter for it Apos is a Dacian or an Illyrian river name
*akmon	stone, rock	PN Άκμονία (Acmonia) in R. Dacia between river Thibiscum and Sarmizegethusa	*ak- ("sharp")	Greek άχμον (akmon, "meteorite")	Lith. akmuo Old Latv. akmuons, Latv. akmens, akmenis Alb. kmesë "sickle" Romanian: ac ("needle")	Lith. RN Akmene, LN Akmenas; Phrygian PN Άκμονία (Akmonia)	Acmonia was spelled Augmonia and Agmonia by the Geographer of Ravenna
*aksi-	black	PN Άξίοπα (Axiopa), town in Scythia Minor, RN Axios, Macedonian river (now Vardar)		Old Persian a-xsei 'black, dark'	Alb. i zi "black", nxij "tarnish"		(i) According to Georgiev, Dacian Axiopa was translated by Slavic successor-population into mod. name Cernavoda ("Black Water"). River Axios was similarly translated into mod. Bulg. name Crna Rijeka ("Black River") (ii) Acc. to Parvulescu, Axios name reflects the Iranic (via the Scythian language) root a-xsei 'black, dark' . (iii) Russu argues Axiopa is not a Dacian name, but a corrupt rendition of Axiopolis (a town of Scythia Minor).
*albo	white	PN Alboca (Dacia) TN = Albocensi	*albho ("white")	Latin albus	Romanian: alb Alb. elb (<PA albi) "barley"		
*alda (noun), *alta- (adj.)	swamp, waterlogged place	PN Άλδανες (Aldanes): fort near Naissus (Moesia Sup.); PN Αλτίνα (Altina): fort nr. Tramarisca	*olda, *olta ("water", "odorous")		Lith. aleti ("flooded"); Latv. aluots, avuots ("source"); Arm. ałt ("filthy"); Alb. balta ("mud", "clay", "dirt"); Rom. baltă ("puddle", "pond")	Latv. RN Aldes. SN Altenes; Lith. RN Altis	The Dacian origin of Aldanes is controversial.
*alm-	to flow, to stream	RN Almus, Dacia Ripensis (Lom, Bulg.}, PN Almo (fort at river-mouth)			Lith. almėti ("to flow uninterruptedly"), Latv. aluot, aluoti		
*amalas	mistletoe (Bot. Viscum album)	PN Amlaidina, prob. in Scythia Minor (Dobrogea, Rom.)			Lith. ãmalas Latv. amuols Rus. oméla		
*ara	river-course, tide	RN Arine river in Dacia, PN Αρίνα, (Arina) fort in Moesia Inf.	*wer- ("to boil")	Gothic runs ("flow")	Lith. vỹris ("whirlpool") Bulg. vir ("whirlpool")	Rom. Arieş, Mureş, Siret, Criş river names in Modern Romania, Lith. RN Arina	
*auras, *auro	water, moisture, pool	RN Αύρας (Auras), river near Istros, Scythia Min.	*uer, *au(e)r 'wet, moisten'	Greek αν-αυρος (an-auros, "without water")	Lith. jūra ("sea") Latv. jūra ("sea") Alb. ujera "waters".	Old Pr. RN Aure	
*baidas	frightening, repulsive	PRN Baedarus (from Drobeta), PRN Bedarus (from Potaissa)	*bhoidho-s (Pok. IEW 162)		Lith. baidýti ("to frighten"); Latv. baîdās, bailes ("fear", "anxiety"), Russian боиться (boit'sja) "to fear"		
*balas,*balos	strong	PRN Decebalus	*bel ('strong'),	Sanskrit bala-m- 'force, strong'	Rom. fală, fălos - pride, imposing Alb. (Gheg) ballas "facing danger",për-balcë "to face, defy"		
*balas	white	PRN Balius (from Dacia)	*bhel- ('white, bright')	Ancient Greek phalos, phalios, anc. Greek balios "dappled"(< balios is considered a loan from Thracian or Illyrian; it is attested as far back as Homer's Iliad)	Rom. bălan (white (horse), blonde), bălai (blonde) Bulg. bial (white); Lith. bãltas Latv. bãls Alb. bardhë "white", Alb. bal, "piebald dog or horse"		
*berza	birch-tree (Bot. Betula)	PN Bersovia, Berzobis town in SW Dacia	*bhereg "shine", "white" including "birch-tree"	Old Bulg. *brěza ("birch-tree")	Bulg. breza Lith. béržas Latv. bērzs Alb. bredh (< earlier *berdh)		Here, it is no observable difference between Thracian and Dacian
*bur, buris	plentiful, rich, swollen	PRN Burebista and PRN Mucabur	*b(e)u-, bh(e)u-('to swell, inflate, plentiful')	Old Indian bhū́-ri-ḥ 'rich, a lot, immense'	Lith. būrys ("a lot, a bunch, a flock"); Latv. burvis (a mag), bur, buris (conjuring); Alb. boll ("plenty")		
*brukla	cranberry (Bot. Vaccinium Oxycoccus)	PN Brucla (fort in Dacia, W of R. Mureş)	*bhreu-k- ("to spread")		Latv. brūkle, brūklene, brūklenāys (cowberry plant-place); Lith. bruknė Alb.brukë "tamarind"	Latv. MN Brùkļu; Lith. SN Bruklynė	
*buta(s)	house, hut, dwelling	PN Βούττις (Buttis)(fort in Dacia Med.); PN Boutae (mountain pass into Dacia)			Lith. bùtas, butà Latv. buts, būda ("small house"); Old Pr. buttan Alb. bujt "dwell, accommodate", bujtinë "small house"	Latv. PN Butani; Old Pr. PN Butyn; Lith. RN Butėnių (kaimas)	The Dacian origin of Bouttis is controversial.
*čuk-	peak, summit	PN Thōkyōdis Via; PN *Thoukysidantikī	*ḱu- ("sharp", "pike")		Rom. ciucă, cioc "beak" Bulg. čuka "small hill" Latv. čuk-ur-s (summit of roof); Alb. çuka "crest", suka "hillock" Greek τσούκα "tumulus" Hung. csùcs	Rom. MN Ciuc (possibly from Hung. csík); Rom. MN Ciucaș	
*daba	character, nature	PRN Δαβεις (Dabis)		Old Slavonic dob-	Lith. dabá Latv. daba Rom. teapă	Pol. PRN Doba, Dobe	
*daba	put in order, good	PRN Dabeis	*dabh ('arrange, suitable')				
*d(i)egis	burning, shining	PRN Degis	dhegʷh ('to burn')	Sanskrit dáhati ("it burns"), Mid Iranian daig	Lith. dègti ("to burn"); Latv. deglis ("burning torch"); Alb. djeg ("burn")		
*dina(s)	place, region, plain	PN Amlaidina, Asbolodina				Old Pr. PN Resedynen	
*dita(s)	light (noun), bright (adj.)	PRN Ditugentus	*dei-, *di- (to shine, shimmer)	Thrac. *ditas	Alb. ditë ("day")	Old Pr. PRN Ditte; Lith. PN Ditava	
*drasda	thrush (bird)	PN Drasdea		Old Slav. drozda	Bulg. drozd thrush Latv. strazds ("thrush") Lith. strazdas ("thrush"); Alb. trishta	Lith. strãzdas Lat. draza Eng. thrush Swe. trast Irish truid	Old Pr. PN Drasda
*dribas/*drigas	wild, restless	PRN Dribalus; PRN Aurelius Drigissa, a veteran of Legio VII Claudia			Latv. dribis, dribulis ("a restless man"); Lith. drignis Alb. dridhem "to shake, tremble"	Latv. PN Driba; Lith. PN Drigotas; Old Latv. RN Dryzel; Rus. (Baltic origin) RN Drigin'a	
*duia	swamp or mist, drizzle	PN Δουιανα (Duiana), fort in Dacia Mediterranea			Lith. dujà (both meanings); Latv. dujs ("dirty"); Alb. ndyj "dirt"	Latv. PN Dujas; Russian (Baltic origin) RN Dyja; Lith. PN Daujėnai	The Dacian origin of this toponym is controversial.
*dūmas	dark brown	PN Dimum (from *Dumum)		Old Bulg. dymŭ ("smoke") Old Irish dumhach ("dark, foggy")	Lith. dūmas Latv. dūms Alb.tym ("fog, smoke, uncertainty"); E.Bengali. "dhuma" (smoke, fog); Bulg. tama ("darkness, uncertainty")	Thrac. PN Δὐμη (Dimi)	
*galtis	sheet-ice, frost	PN Galtis	gel(ǝ) ('cold, freeze')		Latv. gàla Rus. golot Lith. gailus (cold) gelti (to bite, to sting, to ache)	Old Pr. PN Galtengarb	
*genukla	pasture, meadow	PN Γένουκλα (Genucla) (fortress of Getan king Zyraxes on Danube)			Lith. ganyklà Latv. ganīkla Alb. gjanë "river mud"	Latv. SN Dzęnuklis	
*ger	smart, awake	PRN Gerula	*ger-4, grēi-(to grow; to awake)		Latin agilis Rom. "ager" "smart, clever"		
*geras	good (-natured), kind	PRN Gerulo; PRN Gerula	*gʷerH-	Old Bulg. jerti ("to sacrifice")	Lith. gēras ("good"), Alb. gjorë "miserable, wretched"	Lith. PN Gerulių, RN Gerùlis	
*germas	hot, warm	PN Γέρμαζα (Germaza), PN Γερμἰζερα (Germizera)	*g^{hw}er-	Latin formus Sanskrit gharma Old Bulg. jar ("embers")	Rom. "jar" "embers" Latv. gařme Gr. θερμὀς, Alb. zjarm "fire, heat"	Thrac. PN Γερμανἰα; Bulg. RN Germania	
*gilus	deep	PN Gildoba, unknown "Thracian" location where St. Julius was revered			Lith. gilùs Latv. dziļš Old Pr. gillin	Lith. RNs Gilijà, Gilupis, Gỹlė; Old Pr. LN Gilge; Latv. LN Dziļaune	
*gira (giria)	forest or mountain	PN Giridava	gʷeru ('pole, pike')	Sanskrit girí-h ("mountain")	Lith. girė, girià ("forest"); Latv. dzire ("mountain"); Rus. gora 'mountain' Bulg. gora 'forest' Alb. gur "stone"		
*granda	plank	PN Γράνδετον (Grandeton), fort near Naissus (Moesia Superior)		Old Bulg. grenda	Bulg. greda ("beam"); Lith. grandà ("bridge-plank") grindė (from grįsti ("to lay a floor")); Old Pr. grandico Latv. gruõdi Rom. grindă ("wooden beam")	Lith. PN Grandų káimas Latv. RNs Gruõds, Gruõdi, Gruõdupis; Rom. grinda	The Dacian origin of this toponym is controversial.
*griva	river-bed or river-mouth	PN Γρίβο (Grivo), fort near Naissus (moesia Sup.)		Thrac. ? *grava ("valley" or "river-bed")	Latv. grĩva ("river-mouth"); Lith. greva ("river-bed"); Alb. gravë "cave, lair"	Lith. RN Grýva; Latv. RNs Grīva, Grīvīte	The Dacian origin of this toponym is controversial.
kaga	sacred, holy	kaga	*kʷog(h)- (< *kʷeg(h)-)		Old Slav. kazat, skazat ("to tell", "to say")		
*kalas	catfish (?)	RN Calabaeus		Latin squālus ("large sea fish, shark"); Old Norse hualr ("whale")	Old Pr. kalis ("catfish")		
*kapas	hill, slope	PN Καπίδαυα (Capidava)			Lith. kopa Latv. kãpa ("dune, slope"); Alb. kapë ("huge heap")		
*kapura	hill	PN Capora (in basin of river Tyras (Dniester)			Lith. kapùrna ("mossy mound")		
*karpa	to cut, stone	MN Carpates TN Karpoi, Carpi,	*sker, *ker ("to cut"),		Latv. kārpa (from kārpīt ("to dig and to kick")); Alb. karpe (*karp-m-) ("stone"), këput "to cut".	Carpathian Mts., Carpi tribe .	
*karsa	cave	PN Carsion; Thrac. PN Carsaleon			Lith. karstas		
*katas	stable, animal enclosure	PN Κάττουζα (Cattuza)		Avestan kata- ("cellar")	Rom. coteț, Alb. katoq, kotec, "animal enclosure"	Latv. PN Katužs	
*keda	seat, stool	PN Cedonia			Lith. kedė		
*kerba	swampy ground	PN Cerbatis			Lith. kirba	Lith. RN Kerbẽsas	
*kerna	bush	PN *Cerna			Old. Pr. kirno Lith. kirna ("undergrowth")	Lith. LN Kernỹs, Kernavė	
*kerta	clearing in a wood	PN Certie		Old Bulg. chersti / chresti ("to cut, to slash")	Lith. kirsti ("chop"), kertė Latv. cirte (clearing in a wood), cērte (pickaxe)		
*kina	dry ground (mound) in a swamp	PN Ciniscus			Lith. kinė, kinis Latv. cine, cin(i)s		
*klevas	maple-tree (Bot.)	PN Clevora			Lith. klevas Latv. klavs Bulg. klen maple		
*krata	swampy place or pile, heap	PN Κρατίσκαρα (Cratiscara)			Lith. kratà ("heaped"), kritùs ("swampy"); Latv. krata ("shaking when driving on bumpy road")		The Dacian origin of this toponym is controversial.
*kurta	grove (stand of planted trees, often sacred)	PN Κουρτα (Curta); Thrac. PN Κουρτουσουρα (Curtusura)			Old Pr. korto Alb. korije "grove"		
*lug-	swamp, bog	RN Λύγινος (Luginos)		Illyr. ἔλος Λοὐγεον	Serb. lug ("lowland") Latv. luga Rus. luža ("puddle"); Alb.lug ("trough"), ligatinë ("bog"), luginë ("valley")	Gallic PN Lugdunum (Lyon)	
*mala	(river) bank, shore, beach	PN Dacia Malvensis (name of Roman province)			Rom. mal Lith. molas Latv. mala	Alb. mal = elevated ground, mountain, hill.	Dacia Malvensis meant "river-bank Dacia", ref. to its situation on (north) bank of Danube. Name Latinised to Dacia Riparia or Ripensis (Latin: rīpa = "riverbank") in new province created by Aurelian on south side of Danube after evacuation of Dacia.
*maska	pool, puddle	PN Μασκάς (Maskas)				Latv. PN Mãskas	
*mauda(s)	hemlock (Conium)(bot.)	PN Pomodiana			Lith. maudá, máudas	Illyrian PN Pamodus (island)	
*medeka	glade (clearing in a forest)	PN Μέδεκα (Medeka)			Lith. medėkas		The Dacian origin of this toponym is controversial.
*musas	mould, moss	RN Μουσαίος (Museos), Thrac. PN Μωσυπα (Muspa)		Old Slav. мъсһъ Old High German mos ("swamp"); Gr. μὐσος (músos)	Lith. mūsas (mùsas); Alb. myshk "mould, moss"		
*nara(s)	river, brook	RN (Rom. from Dac.) Nǎruja			Lith. nérti ("to dive", "swim underwater"); Latv. nāra ("mermaid" from nirt ("to dive")); Alb. hum-nerë "precipice, chasm"	Lith. RN Neris, Narùpis; Illyr. RN Νάρον	
*net-	flow	PN Νετίνδαυα (Netindava), RN Netupa		Latin natāre ("to swim")	Alb.not "to swim" Rom.înot "to swim"		
*padas	threshing-floor	PN Παδισάρα (Padisara)			Lith. pãdas Bulg. pad fall		
*pala, *palma	swamp, bog	PN Παλαδεινα (Paladina); PN Palmatis		Latin palūs	Lith. pãlios Latv. pali ("floods"); Alb.pellg ("swamp")	Lith. RN Palminỹs	
*pil-	to flow	RN Gilpil			Lith. pilti ("to pour, to flow"); Latv. pilt ("to drip, to fill up"), pile ("a drop"); Bulg. pilea scatter		
*preida	pine-tree (Bot. pinus)	PN Πρέιδις (Pridis)			Latv. priẽde Alb.bredh ("fir tree"); Bulg. bor ("pine-tree")		
*put-	to swell, thicken	PN Putina			Lith. pūstis ("to swell"); Lith pùtinas ("snowball")	Old Latv. PRN Putte	
*rabo, rebo	'to move' 'to flow' 'be in motion'	RN Rabon river in Dacia (Jiul?) It was etymologically connected with Arabon (Narabon?) from Pannonia	*rebh 'to move' 'to flow' 'be in motion'		Lith. riedėti ("to roll") Alb. rrjedh ("to flow")		
*ramus	peaceful, restful	PN Ραμίδαυα (Ramidava); Thrac. PN Rhamae		Sanskrit rámate	Bulg. hram ("temple, church") Lith. ramùs Latv. rāms ("calm, peaceful"); Alb. ramun ("fallen asleep")	Latv. Rāmava	
*rō(u)ka	drizzle, fine rain	PN (from RN) Rhocobae			Lith. rõkė Alb. rrjedh "to flow" or rajka "falling(snow, rain etc.)"		
*rus-	to flow	PN Rusidava; Thrac. PN Ροὐσιον			Lith. ruséti ("to flow slowly"); Alb.rreshje "precipitation"		
*san-apa	confluence (of two rivers)	RN Sanpaeus			Lith. Santaka	Lith. LN Sampė (< *San-upė)	
*sausas	dry	PRN Sausa	*saus- ('dry')		Lith. saũsas Latv. sauss ("dry"); Alb. thatë "dry" Bulg. suh ("dry")		
*sermas	river, river-current	PN Sirmium					
*skabas	sharp, quick, lively	PRN Σκαβης (Scabis)		Latin scābēre ("to scratch")	Lith. skubus ("prompt, swift"), skabùs ("sharp"), skabrùs ("quick, lively"); Latv. skuba ("hurry"), skubināt ("to hurry, to rush") Bulg. skube ("to pluck"); Alb. i shkathët "quick, prompt"		
*skaudus	painful, sad or powerful	TN Scaugdae			Bulg. skuden ("scarce, impoverished") Lith. skaudùs Latv. skauds, skaudrs ("very intensive" (pain))		
*skena	clearing (in a wood)	PN Scenopa			Lith. nuo-skena		
*skuia	fir-tree (Bot.)	PN Σκουάνες (Scuanes)	sk(h)u̯oi̯-, sk(h)u̯i(i̯)- ('needle, thorn')	Old Slav. chvoja (pine needles/branches)	Latv. skuja ("spruce-needle"); Alb. hu "stake, picket, pole"		The Dacian origin of this toponym is controversial.
*skumbras	hill, down	PN Σκουμβρο (Scumbro)		Old Alb. zëmbres, zbres ("to go down)	Latv. kumbrs ("rounded top of a hill")		The Dacian origin of this toponym is controversial.
*spirus	fast, quick, rapid	RN Πασπίριος (Paspirios)			Lith. spėrus Latv. spars ("force, zeal"), spert ("to hit quickly") Old Alb. shpjertë, Alb. shpejtë "fast, quick" Bulg. skoro ("quickly, fast") Bulg. spri ("to suddenly stop")		
*stendas	stiff, rigid, viscose	PN Στένδαι (Stende)			Lith. standùs, Alb. tendos "rigid", Bulg. stena ("wall")	Latv. RN Steñde	The Dacian origin of this toponym is controversial.
*suka	rip, tear, gap	PN Σουκίδαυα (Sucidava); Thrac. PN Succi (mt. pass)		Old Bulg. shtuka ("pike - for hunting river fish")	Lith. šùkė Latv. sukums Alb. shuk or shkun "to shake, beat, push"		
*sunka	liquid, to flow	PN (from RN) Σονκητα (Sunkita)			Lith. sunkà ("liquid", "tree-sap"), Alb. lëng "liquid"	Lith. RN Sunkìnė	
*suras	salty, bitter	PN Σούρικον (Suricon)			Lith. sūras Latv. sūrs ("salty and bitter") Bulg. surov ("bitter, sour"); Alb. shurrë "urine", "sour liquid"		
*taras	chatterer, gossiper	PRN Tara			Lith. tarti ("to say") Alb.thërras "call"		
*tauta	people, nation, country	PRN Tautomedes	Old Bulg. toujdĭ ("foreigner")	Old Pr. tauto ("country"); Goth. thiuda ("people"); Old Irish tuath ("people")	Lith. tautà ("people, country"); Latv. tauta ("people"), Alb.Tënde ("your kin", "your own")		
*tiras	bare, barren, desolate	FN Τίριξις (Tirizis)			Lith. týras Latv. tīrs ("clean")		
*tut-	blow, emit smoke	RN Τοὐτης (Tutes)			Lith. tűtúoti ("to blow", "to sound horn"); Ger. tuten ("to hoot"); Alb. tyta "pipe, barrel", tym/tymos "smoke, to smoke"	Lith RN Tūtupis	
*upa	river	PN Scenopa			Lith. upė Latv. upe ("river")		
*urda(s)	stream, brook	RN Όρδησσός (Ordessos); Thrac. PN (from RN) Οὐρδαυς (Urdanes)			Lith. urdulỹs Latv. urdaviņa Alb. hurdhë "brook"	Celtic RN Urda, Bulg. RN Arda	
*vaigas	fast, rapid	PN (from RN) Aegeta				Lith. RN Váigupis	
*varpa	whirlpool	PN (from RN) Άρπις (Harpis)			Lith. verpetas Latv. virpa ("whirlpool"); Alb. vorbull "whirlpool"	Lith. RN Varpė	
*visas	fertile, fruitful	PN Βισ-δίνα (Visdina)			Lith. vislus, vaisùs	Lith. PN Visalaukė	
*zalmo-	fur, skin, shield	PRN Ζαλμοδεγικος (Zalmodenicos); Ζάλμοξις (Zalmoxis)			Alb. thelmë "rag, patch" (in sewing)		
*zelmas	shoot (of a plant)	PRN Ζαλμοδεγικος			Lith. želmuo Latv. zelmenis ("a field of shoots, shoots in the field"), zelt ("to grow, to become green"); Alb. çel ("blossom")		
*zud-as	careful, precise	PRN Zude			Latv. zūdit ("to take care")	Lith. PN Zude, Zudius	Alb. kujdes ("to take care")
*zuras	hot, shining	RN Zyras		Sanskrit jūrvati ("scorched")	Bulg. zora ("dawn") Latv. zvêruot ("to light up", "shine"), Lith.žaros ("sparkles, glow"), Alb.Ziej, i zier ("boiling" "hot")	Latv. PN (< RN) Zūras; Lith. RN Žiūrà	

== Alleged words reconstructed from Romanian and Albanian ==
Georgiev, Duridanov and Russu concur that the Dacian language constitutes the main pre-Latin substratum of the modern Romanian language. Duridanov also accepts Georgiev's theory that modern Albanian is descended from "Daco-Moesian". Where words in modern Albanian and/or Romanian can be plausibly linked to an Indo-European root and modern cognates of similar meaning, a reconstruction of the putative Dacian originals have been proposed by Duridanov, who included them in a separate list from words reconstructed from placenames.

CAVEAT: The following word-reconstructions are based on the assumption that the Albanian language is descended from "Daco-Moesian". This theory is contested by many linguists, especially Albanian, who consider the language a direct descendant of the extinct Illyrian language. Thus, reconstructions based on modern Albanian words, or Romanian substratum words with Albanian cognates, may in reality represent ancient Illyrian, rather than Dacian, elements. In addition, the reconstructions below, unlike those in Table A above, are not validated by Dacian place- or personal names. The "Dacianity" of the reconstructions is therefore completely speculative, in comparison to those derived from placenames. (N.B. Even if Albanian is descended from Illyrian, the reconstructions below could nevertheless represent Dacian elements if the "Daco-Illyrian" theory - that the Dacian and Illyrian languages were closely related - is correct; or if the words below represent Illyrian borrowings from "Daco-Moesian", but not if they represent "Daco-Moesian" borrowings from Illyrian)

TABLE C: ALLEGED DACIAN WORDS RECONSTRUCTED FROM ALBANIAN AND ROMANIAN WORDS
Dacian word	Meaning	Albanian and Romanian word	Possible Indo-European root-word(s)	Modern cognates	Notes
*bred-	fir-tree (Abies alba)	Alb. bredh Rom. brad	*bhreg'-os, *bhrog'-os (Pokorny IEW 139)	Lith. brãzas (resin), Old Slav. brěza (birch)	
*daina	song	Rom. dialect daină, doină Alb. zana "mountain fairy"	*doina	Lith. dainà, Lat. daīņa	
*mal-	bank, shore or mountain	Alb. mal (mountain); Rom. mal (bank, shore)	*mol- (Pok. aaO. 721f)	Lat. mala (beach, shore)	
*spand-	hellebore (plant: Helleborus purpurescens)	Alb. shpendër Rom. spînz	*sponǎ(i)- (Georgiev 1965 p80)	Lat. spuóds (bright)	
*skrumb	ash, burnt material	Alb. shkrumb Rom. scrum	*skrṃb(h)-	Lith. skrembù (skrebti)	Old Prussian placename Scrumbayn (today Schrombehnen)
*strunga	milking-enclosure	Alb. shtrungë Rom. strungă	*strṇgā		Dacian placename Στρὁγγες (Proc. Aed. IV.4)
*zuv-	fish	Rom. juvete (a species of fish)	*g'hduụ- (Pok. IEW 416)	Lith. žuvis Lat. dial. zuva	Dac. placename Ζουσἱδαυα

== See also ==
- List of Romanian words of possible Dacian origin
- List of Dacian plant names
- List of Dacian names
- Dacian language
- Baltic languages
- Thracian language
- Phrygian language
- Albanian–Romanian linguistic relationship
- Davae
- List of ancient cities in Thrace and Dacia
