= List of Dacian towns and fortresses =

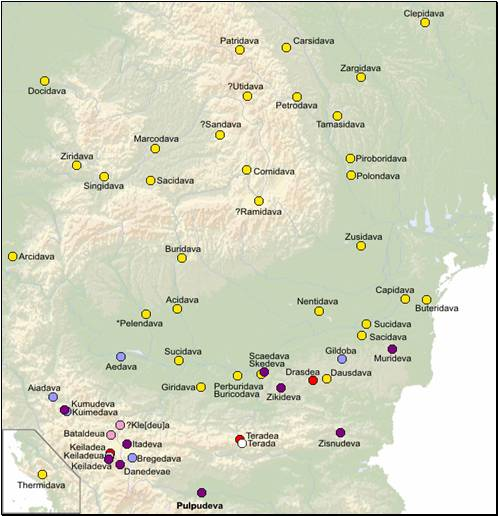
Dacian towns and fortresses with the dava ending, covering Dacia, Moesia, Thrace and Dalmatia

This is a list of ancient Dacian towns and fortresses from all the territories once inhabited by Dacians, Getae and Moesi. The large majority of them are located in the traditional territory of the Dacian Kingdom at the time of Burebista. This area includes the present-day countries of Romania and Moldova, as well as parts of mostly southern and eastern Ukraine, Slovakia, Poland and Hungary, as well as ancient Moesia (Eastern Serbia, Northern Bulgaria). However some isolated settlements are located in Dalmatia (modern Albania and Croatia) as is the case of Thermidava, or in Dardania as is Quemedava.

The Dacian towns are also called davae (singular dava) since many names were composed of an initial lexical element affixed to -dava, -daua, -deva, -deba, -daba, or -dova, which meant "city", "town" or "fortress"" in the Dacian language (<PIE *dhe-, "to set, place" or *dhewa, "settlement"). Generally, the name indicated a tribal center or an important settlement, usually fortified.

The known towns names have been are attested by Ptolemy (1st century AD) and other ancient writers, but many have not been identified in the field yet. Conversely, there are many recent discoveries of Dacian settlements and fortresses, but most of them have no assigned names yet.

Some of the Dacian settlements and the fortresses employed the traditional Murus Dacicus (Dacian Wall) construction technique.

== Table ==
Picture	Name	Tribe	Founded	Attested by	Area (ha)	Discovery	Location	Country
	Acidava (Acidaua)	?	?	Tabula Peutingeriana	?	?	Enoșești	Romania
	Acmonia (Ancient Greek: Ἀκμωνία, romanized: Akmonia; Agnaviae; Agmonia)	?	?	Ptolemy's Geographia; Tabula Peutingeriana; Ravenna Cosmography	?	?	between Marga and Zăvoi	Romania
	Aedava (Ancient Greek: Ἀέδαβα)	?	Unknown; Justinian (r. 527–565) restored the damaged portion of the town defenses	Procopius, De Aedificiis	?	?	on the Danubian road between Augustae and Variana	Bulgaria
	Aiadava	?	?	?	?	?	Bela Palanka	Serbia
	Aizis	?	?	?	?	?	Fârliug	Romania
	Amutria	?	?	?	?	?	?	Romania
	Apulon	?	?	?	?	?	Alba Iulia	Romania
	Arcina	?	?	?	?	?	?	Romania
	Arcobadara	?	?	?	?	?	?	Romania
	(Mala Kopania)	?	?	?	?	?	Mala Kopania	Ukraine
	(Zemplín)	?	?	?	?	?	Zemplín	Slovakia

== See also ==
- List of ancient cities in Thrace and Dacia
- Dacia
- Dacians
- Romanian archaeology
- List of castra in Dacia
- List of castles in Romania
