= List of Dacian names =

Dacians were among the inhabitants of Eastern Europe before and during the Roman Empire. Many hundreds of personal names and placenames are known from ancient sources, and they throw light on Dacian and the extent to which it differed from Thracian.

== Anthroponyms ==
Around 1150 Dacian anthroponyms (personal names) and 900 toponyms (placenames) have been preserved in ancient sources. As far as the onomastic (proper names) of Dacians and Thracians is concerned, opinions are divided. According to Crossland (1982), the evidence of names from the Dacian, Mysian and Thracian area seems to indicate divergence of a 'Thraco-Dacian' language into northern and southern groups of dialects, but not so different as to rank Thracian and Dacian as separate languages, There were also the development of special tendencies in word formation and of certain secondary phonetic features in each group. Mateescu (1923), Rosetti (1978) sustain that Thracian onomastic include elements that are common to Geto-Dacians and Bessians (a Thracian tribe). A part of researchers support that onomastically, Dacians are not different from the other Thracians in Roman Dacia's inscriptions. But recently, D. Dana basing himself on new onomastic material recorded in Egyptian ostraka suggested criteria which would make possible to distinguish between closely related Thracian and Dacian-Moesian names and singled out certain specific elements for the latter.

In Georgiev's opinion (1960; 1977) Dacian placenames and personal names are "completely different" from their Thracian counterparts.

Several Dacian names have also been identified with ostracons of Dacian cavalry recruited after the Roman conquest and stationed in East Egypt, i.e. Dadas and Dadazi, Zoutoula, Dotos and Dotouzi, Dieri and Diernais, Diengis, Dida(s), Blaikisa, Blegissa, Diourdanos, Thiadicem, Avizina, Dourpokis, Kaigiza, Dardiolai, Denzibalos (see also Dacian king name Deki-balos), Denzi-balus (attested in Britain), Pouridour, Thiaper and Tiatitis, Dekinais, *Rolouzis, (See Ostraca from Krokodilo and Didymoi)

=== A ===
Dacian name	Possible etymology	Attestation	Notes
Avizina		Ostracon of Dacian cavalry recruited after the Roman conquest and stationed in East Egypt	Probably related to Vezina.

=== B ===
Dacian name	Possible etymology	Attestation	Notes
Bastiza		Name frequently found at Mons Claudianus i.e. two persons have this name on a list of Dacian names, but this name is also the patronyme of the soldier named Diernaios.	The name ‘'bast'’ is found in Thrace (cf. Decev) but never as Bastiza.
Bikili(s)		Decebal's friend (Dio Cassius)	
Blegissa		Ostracon of Dacian cavalry recruited after the Roman conquest and stationed in East Egypt	
Blaesus		Child of a soldier of cohors I Aelia Dacorum	
Blaikisa		Ostracon of Dacian cavalry recruited after the Roman conquest and stationed in East Egypt	
Brasus		Inscription at Apulum that reads: Mucatra, son of Brasus, had a son and heir Mucapor Mucatralis	According to Mommsen (1887), the name is formed by the compounds with –poris i.e. Mucaporis appear as Thracian and as Dacian in numerous cases
Burebista	"Possessor of so much" cf Sanskrit bhuri "plenty, so much" and cf Ancient Iranian victa "possessor",	King of Dacians (Strabo, Jordanes and Decree of Dionysopolis)	See also: Buri, Buridavense, Buridava, Buricodava. See also Ariovistus.

=== C ===
Dacian name	Possible etymology	Attestation	Notes
Charnabon		King of the Getae (Sophocles's Triptolemos)	
Comosicus		Dacian High Priest and King who lived in the 1st century BC (Jordanes)	
Cothelas, Gudila		King of the Getae in the 4th century BC	
Cotiso	Cotiso 'loved'	King of the Dacians in the 1st century BC	Wilhelm Tomaschek compared this name with the name Cotela of a Getian prince and with the name Cotys, name of several Odrysian and Sapaean (Thracian) princes. Also, he compared with the name Kotys, the Thracian goddess worshipped by the Edonians, a tribe that lived around Pangaion Mountain. He sees here again, the letter "o" as an obscured indistinct, pronunciation of "a". Therefore, he compared Cotiso with the Bactrian Kata "loved".

=== D ===
Dacian name	Possible etymology	Attestation	Notes
Dablosa		He is attested at Mons Claudianus(O. Claud. II 402 and 403).	
Dadas		Ostracon of Dacian cavalry recruited after the Roman conquest and stationed in East Egypt	
Dadazi		Ostracon of Dacian cavalry recruited after the Roman conquest and stationed in East Egypt	
Daizus		Thraco-Getian name Daizus Comozoi, interfectus a Castabocis. Daizus Comozoi is a "Royal" Dacian name found also with Thracians from south of the Danube.	
Damanais		Damanais attested at Mons Claudianus as the father of the Dacian soldier Dida from Krokodilo.	
Dapyx		Dacian king.	
Danillo		Roman Legionnaire	
Dardanos	'Darda-‘ appears as both Daco-Mysian and Thracian.		
Dardiolai		Ostracon of Dacian cavalry recruited after the Roman conquest and stationed in East Egypt	
Decaeneus	"The one who knows" (dak, dek cf. Sanskrit dasa) or "The Dacian"	High priest and king of Dacians (Strabo, Dio Cassius, Jordanes)	
Decibalus		Child of a soldier of cohors I Aelia Dacorum	
Decebalus	Dacian word balas /balos is from PIE *bel 'strong, power' cf. Sanskrit bala "force" and Dece from PIE *dek 'to take, to honor' Also, it had been suggested Decebalus means "The force of the Dacians"	King of Dacians (Dio Cassius)	Originally named Diurpaneus, after his victory against Romans he was called Decebalus ("The brave one") Many interpretations are possible for the PIE root *dek that is found also with the name Decaeneus
Denzibalos		Ostracon of Dacian cavalry recruited after the Roman conquest and stationed in East Egypt	
Denzibalus		Attested in Britannia	
Dekinais		Ostracon of Dacian cavalry recruited after the Roman conquest and stationed in East Egypt	
Dicomes		king of Dacians	
Dida		Aelius Dida - Dacian centurion of cohors I Aelia Dacorum stationed in Britannia.	
Dida(s)		Dacian soldier from Krokodilo.	
Diegis	Diegis / Degis from *dhegh ‘to burn'	Dacian	
Diengis		Ostracon of Dacian cavalry recruited after the Roman conquest and stationed in East Egypt	
Dieri		Ostracon of Dacian cavalry recruited after the Roman conquest and stationed in East Egypt	
Diernais		Ostracon of Dacian cavalry recruited after the Roman conquest and stationed in East Egypt	
Diourdanos		Ostracon of Dacian cavalry recruited after the Roman conquest and stationed in East Egypt	
Diurpaneus	"admired from distance" cf. Sanskrit durepanya	Name of the king of Dacians (Dio Cassius) He was renamed to Decebalus after victory over Romans.	It is a "Royal" Dacian name found also with Thracians from south of the Danube i.e. Dorpanas (IGB, II, 771) and Dyrpanais (Olbia).
Dourpokis		Ostracon of Dacian cavalry recruited after the Roman conquest and stationed in East Egypt	
Dotos		Ostracon of Dacian cavalry recruited after the Roman conquest and stationed in East Egypt	
Dotouzi		Ostracon of Dacian cavalry recruited after the Roman conquest and stationed in East Egypt	
Drilgisa		With the inscription CIL VI 1801 as Natopor's brother at Rome.	Note also the following names: Drigissa in Superior Moesia and Dia-giza, slave at Rome, CIL XV 2445.
Dromichaetes, Dromichaeta		Name of the king of Getae It appears this is a Hellenised form	
Duccidava		Daughter of a Dacian soldier mentioned in a Roman military diploma issued in 127 in Mauretania Caesariensis	
Duras		King of the Dacians between 69 AD - 87 AD (Jordanes)	

=== K ===
Dacian name	Possible etymology	Attestation	Notes
Kaigiza		Ostracon of Dacian cavalry recruited after the Roman conquest and stationed in East Egypt	
Komakiza		Koma-kiza / Koma-kissa is a name attested at Didymoi.	The endings term correspond to the Dacian king name Komosicus.
Komozoi		Father of Daizus. Daizus Comozoi is a "Royal" Dacian name found also with Thracians from south of the Danube.	

=== M ===
Dacian name	Possible etymology	Attestation	Notes
Moskon		Inscription on silver coins about a 3rd-century BC getic king	
Mucapor		Inscription at Apulum that reads: Mucatra, son of Brasus, had a son and heir Mucapor Mucatralis	These names are Thracians and Dacians (as Mucapor is attested as Dacian and as Thracian name). The names containing Muca- are found in Thracian but also in the proper Geto-Dacian names
Mucatra		Inscription at Apulum that reads: Mucatra, son of Brasus, had a son and heir Mucapor Mucatralis.	These names are probably Thracian, not Dacian, as Mucapor is attested as an ethnic Thracian name (see refs above).

=== N ===
Dacian name	Possible etymology	Attestation	Notes
Natoporus	cf. Sanskrit nata 'bent', de nam 'bend' and cf. Nath 'lean, rely', 'seek for help'	Dacian name of a prince from a Dacian royal family of the tribe of the Costoboci on a Roman inscription (II No. 1801)	See also Dacian Natu-spardo (attested with Ammianus) NOTE: some scholars consider this a Thracian name.

=== O ===
Dacian name	Possible etymology	Attestation	Notes
Oroles, Orola	From ar-, or- 'eagle, big bird'	Name of a Dacian prince (Justin)	

=== P ===
Dacian name	Possible etymology	Attestation	Notes
Petoporus, Petipor		Name of a Dacian prince	
Pieporus	The first element Pie is analogue by initial and vocalism with the name Pie-figoi of a Dacian tribe mentioned by Ptolemy. The second element -porus is often met with Dacian and also with Bithynian (a Thracian tribe) names. Tomaschek explained it by the root *par 'replenish, nourish' or as *pa-la 'king'	Name of a king of the Costoboci (inscription C.1 Rom. VI, No. 1801).	NOTE: Linguists Georgiev and Ivan Duridanov consider this a Thracian name; second element -por (variations: -puri, -pyra-s, -poris, -pouris) comparable to Latin puer 'son, child'.
Pouridour		Ostracon of Dacian cavalry recruited after the Roman conquest and stationed in East Egypt	

=== R ===
Dacian name	Possible etymology	Attestation	Notes
Rescuturme	The Dacian name Rescuturme can be related to the Aryan word rai "splendor, wealth" and raevant, revant "brilliant", if "-sk" is part of a derivation.	Name of a Dacian woman. Inscription (CIL III 1195),	cf. names Resculum (a hamlet from Dacia) and Rascuporis / Rascupolis (name with Sapaean and Bithynian Thracian tribes)
Rhemaxos		Getic king who ruled to the north of the Danube around 200 BC	
Rholes, Roles		Getae chieftain in Scythia Minor (Dio Cassius)	
Rigozus		Anthroponym.	
Rolouzis		Ostracon of Dacian cavalry recruited after the Roman conquest and stationed in East Egypt	
Rubobostes		Dacian king in Transylvania in the 2nd century BC	

=== S ===
Dacian name	Possible etymology	Attestation	Notes
Scorylo	From root *sker 'to leap, spin'	Name of a Dacian general	Cf. Scoris (Scorinis), a "Royal" Dacian name found also with Thracians from south of the Danube.

=== T ===
Dacian name	Possible etymology	Attestation	Notes
Tarbus	"hard, strong, powerful" cf. Bactrian thaurva (de tarva)	possibly a prince of the Free Dacians	
Thiadicem		Ostracon of Dacian cavalry recruited after the Roman conquest and stationed in East Egypt	
Thiamarkos		Dacian king (inscription "Basileys Thiamarkos epoiei")	
Thiaper		Ostracon of Dacian cavalry recruited after the Roman conquest and stationed in East Egypt	
Tiati		With the inscription CIL VI 1801 at Rome.	
Tiatitis		Ostracon of Dacian cavalry recruited after the Roman conquest and stationed in East Egypt	
Tsinna, Zinnas, Sinna		Zinnas in IOSPE I^{2} 136, Olbia, late 1st-early 2nd century; Tsinna son of Bassus in ISM V 27, Capidava (Scythia Minor), 2nd century; Titus Aurelius Sinna from Ratiaria (Moesia Superior) in CIL III 14507, Viminacium (Moesia Superior), year 195; Sinna in a military diploma for year 246 (no other details provided, but it was published by Peter Weiss in "Ausgewahlte neue Militardiplome" in Chiron 32 (2002), p. 513-7)	
Tsiru		Tsiru son of Bassus in ISM V 27, Capidava (Scythia Minor), 2nd century	

=== V ===
Dacian name	Possible etymology	Attestation	Notes
Vezina, Vezinas	'Active, vigorous, energetic', from PIE *ueg	Main advisor of Decebalus	

=== Z ===
Dacian name	Possible etymology	Attestation	Notes
Zalmoxis		Dacian god	
Zalmodegikos		Getan king who ruled around 200 BC	
Zebeleizis, Gebeleizis, Gebeleixis, Nebeleizis		Other name of the Dacian god Zalmoxis	
Zia	"mare", cf. Thracian Ziaka, Sanskrit hayaka "horse" (See Thracian name Ziacatralis "who feeds the horses")	Dacian name of a princess. Variant: Ziais	
Zoutula		Ostracon of Dacian cavalry recruited after the Roman conquest and stationed in East Egypt	
Zyraxes	"Powerful prince" cf. Bactrian Zura, Zavare "power" and cf. Khsaya "prince"	Prince of the Getae	A similar name's form is found in the city name Zurobara, from bara/vara ("city") and zuro ("fortified")

== Toponyms ==
No	Dacian name	Etymology	Modern city/Location	Attestation	Notes
1	Acidava (Acidaua)		Enoșești, Olt County, Romania	Tabula Peutingeriana	
2	Amutria (Amutrion, Amutrium, Admutrium, Ad Mutrium, Ad Mutriam, Ancient Greek: Ἀμούτριον)		Hypothetically located at one of the following sites in Oltenia (Southwestern Romania): Valea Perilor, commune Cătunele, Gorj County; Motru, Gorj County; Gura Motrului, commune Butoiești, Mehedinți County; Botoșești-Paia, Dolj County	Ptolemy's Geographia, Tabula Peutingeriana	
3	Apula (Apulon)		Piatra Craivii, 20 km North of Alba-Iulia, Romania	Tabula Peutingeriana	Apulum in Latin, see also Apuli
4	Bersobis (Berzobim)	"White, shine" including birch-tree from root *bhereg > ber(e)z Alternatively, it could be compared with Berzama, place name from Thrace between Amhialos and Kabyle and Bactrian Bareza 'height'	Modern Berzovia village in Caraș-Severin County, on the bank of river Bârzava, Romania	The sole surviving sentence from Trajan's campaign journal in the Latin grammar work of Priscian, Institutiones grammaticae	
5	Napoca (Napuca)	The following are the most important hypotheses regarding Napoca's etymology: Dacian name having the same root "nap" (cf. ancient Armenian root "nap") with that of the Dacia's river Naparis attested by Herodotus. It has an augmentative suffix uk/ok i.e. over, great; Name derived from that of the Dacianized Scythian tribe known as Napae; Name probably akin to the indigenous (Thracian) element in Romanian, the word năpârcă 'viper' cf. Albanian nepërkë, nepërtkë; Name derived from the Ancient Greek term napos (νάπος) "timbered valley"; Name derived from the Indo-European *snā-p- (Pokorny 971–2) "to flow, to swim, damp".; Independent of these hypotheses, scholars agree that the name of the settlement predates the Roman conquest (AD 106).	Cluj-Napoca, Romania	Tabula Peutingeriana	

== Hydronyms ==
Dacian name	Modern name	Etymology	Attestation
Alutus, Aloutas	Olt	Possible etymology: Sanskrit alu, meaning "float, raft, water pot, small water jar"	Ptolemy, Jordanes
Amutrion, Amutria	Motru	Skt. *mūtra "dripping water, urine", Skt. Jīmūta, "clouds that cause rain but not thunder"	
Argessos, Ordessos	Argeș		
Buseos	Buzău	Originally Μ[π]ουσεος, where Μπ is pronounced as B	
Crisus	Criș		
Donaris	Upper Danube		
Hyerassus, Tiarantos, Gerasus, Seratos	Siret		
Istros	Upper Danube	The Ancient Greek Istros was a borrowing from Thracian/Dacian meaning "strong, swift", akin to Sanskrit is.iras "swift".	
Maris, Marisos	Mureș		Herodotus, Strabo
Naparis	Ialomița	a) According to Russu, 'flow' / 'moisture'. It has probably the same root with Napoca (modern Cluj-Napoca) b) According to Parvan, after Tomaschek, the meaning is similar with Lith. Napras, in which there is a high probability of the root *nebh- "to spring". c) According to Bogrea, 'spring' - compared with Old Persian napas 'spring'	Herodotus (IV 48),
Patissus, Pathissus, Tisia	Tisa		
Pyretus, Pyretos, Pyresos, Porata	Prut		
Rabon	Jiu		
Samus	Someș		
Sargetia	Strei		
Tyras	Nistru		
Tibisis	Timiș		Herodotus

== See also ==
- Dacian language
- List of Dacian plant names
- List of Romanian words of possible Dacian origin
- Davae
- List of Dacian towns
- List of Dacian tribes
- List of Dacian kings
- List of historical monuments in Romania
