= Sacidava =

Savidava may refer to one of the following:

- Sacidava (Dacia)
- Sacidava (Moesia)
  - Sacidava (castra), the Roman fort built near the Getic settlement Sacidava in Moesia
