= Keiladeva =

Dacian town

Keiladeva (Keiladeua, Keiladea, Keilada Ancient Greek: Κειλαδεβα, Κειλαδεουα, Κειλαδεα, Κειλαδεβη[νῳ]) was a Dacian town mentioned in toponomastic inscriptions.

== See also ==
- Dacian davae
- List of ancient cities in Thrace and Dacia
- Dacia
- Roman Dacia
