= Acidava =

Ancient Dacian and Roman settlement in modern Romania

- Acidaua
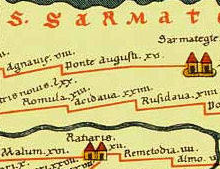

- Location within Romania
- 44.375411°N 24.277634°E
- Location: Enoșești, Olt County, Romania

Site notes
- Elevation: 127 m (417 ft)

Acidava (Acidaua) was a Dacian and later Roman town and fort on the Olt river near the lower Danube. The settlement's remains are located in today's Enoşeşti, Olt County, Oltenia, Romania.

== History ==
After the Roman conquest of Dacia by Roman Emperor Trajan, Acidava became a civilian and military centre, with castra being built in the area. Acidava was part of the Limes Alutanus, a line of fortifications built under emperor Hadrian running north–south along the Alutus (Olt) river. The function of the limes was to monitor the Roxolani to the east and deter any possible attacks.

Acidava is depicted in the Tabula Peutingeriana between Romula and Rusidava.

The same document depicts a second Acidava, between Cedoniae and Apula, but some authors believe it is actually a copy error and the correct name is Sacidava, another Dacian town.

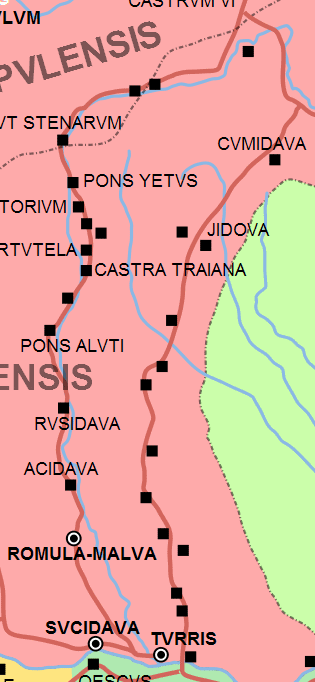
Acidava within Limes Alutanus – Red line to the left

== See also ==
- Acidava (castra)
- Dacia
- Roman Dacia
- List of ancient cities in Thrace and Dacia
- Dacian davae
