= Desudaba =

Dacian fortified settlement

Desudaba (Desudava?) was a Thracian town in the tribal district of Maedica, in ancient Macedonia. It was located 75 M.P. from Almana, on the Axius, where the mercenaries of the Gauls who had been summoned by Perseus of Macedon in the campaign of 168 BCE, took up their position. Writing the 19th century, William Martin Leake placed it at or near Kumanovo, on one of the confluents of the Upper Axius.

== See also ==
- Dacian davae
- List of ancient cities in Thrace and Dacia
- Dacia
- Roman Dacia
