= Itadava =

Dacian fortified settlement

Buricodava
- Itadeva, Itadeba
- Location: Burgaraca, North Macedonia

Itadava (Itadeva, Itadeba, Ancient Greek: Ἰταδεβά) was a Dacian town, in the territory of the fortress with unknown name near Burgaraca.

== See also ==
- Dacian davae
- List of ancient cities in Thrace and Dacia
- Dacia
- Roman Dacia
