= Arcobara =

Dacian settlement

- Arkobadara
- Location within Romania
- 47.21°N 24.10°E
- Location: Ilișua, Bistrița-Năsăud County, Romania

Arcobara (previously identified as Arcobadara (Arkobadara, Ancient Greek: Ἀρκοβάδαρα)) was a Dacian town mentioned by Ptolemy.

== See also ==
- Arcobara (castra)
- Dacian davae
- List of ancient cities in Thrace and Dacia
- Dacia
- Roman Dacia
