= Dausdava =

Dacian fortified settlement

- Location within Bulgaria
- 43.53°N 26.51°E
- Location: Razgrad, Bulgaria

Dausdava (Ancient Greek: Δαούσδαυα) was a Dacian town in Moesia between the Danube and the Balkan Mountains, in the region between Nicopolis (modern Nikopol, Bulgaria) and Abritus (modern Razgrad).

== See also ==
- Dacian davae
- List of ancient cities in Thrace and Dacia
- Dacia
- Roman Dacia
