= Carsidava =

Dacian town

Carsidava (Ancient Greek: Καρσίδαυα) was a Dacian town. Recent research placed Carsidava near Soroca town in Moldova.

== See also ==
- Dacian davae
- List of ancient cities in Thrace and Dacia
- Dacia
- Roman Dacia
