= Sacidava (castra) =

Fort in Moesia, Holy Roman Empire

- Location within Romania
- 44.2403°N 27.8492°E
- Type: Auxiliary camp
- Location: Dunăreni, Aliman, Constanța, Romania

History
- Founded: 2nd century CE
- Abandoned: early 7th century CE

Site notes
- Archaeologists: Vasile Parvan
- Discovered: 1969
- Condition: Ruined

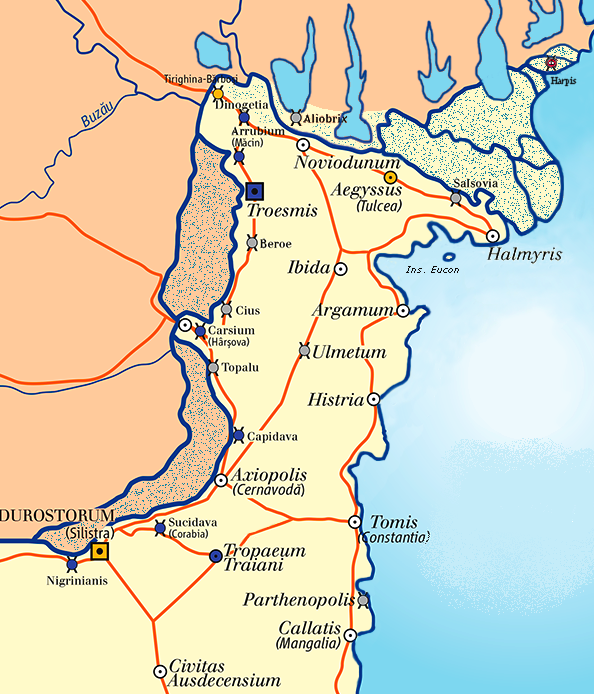
Eastern Moesia and Limes Moesiae

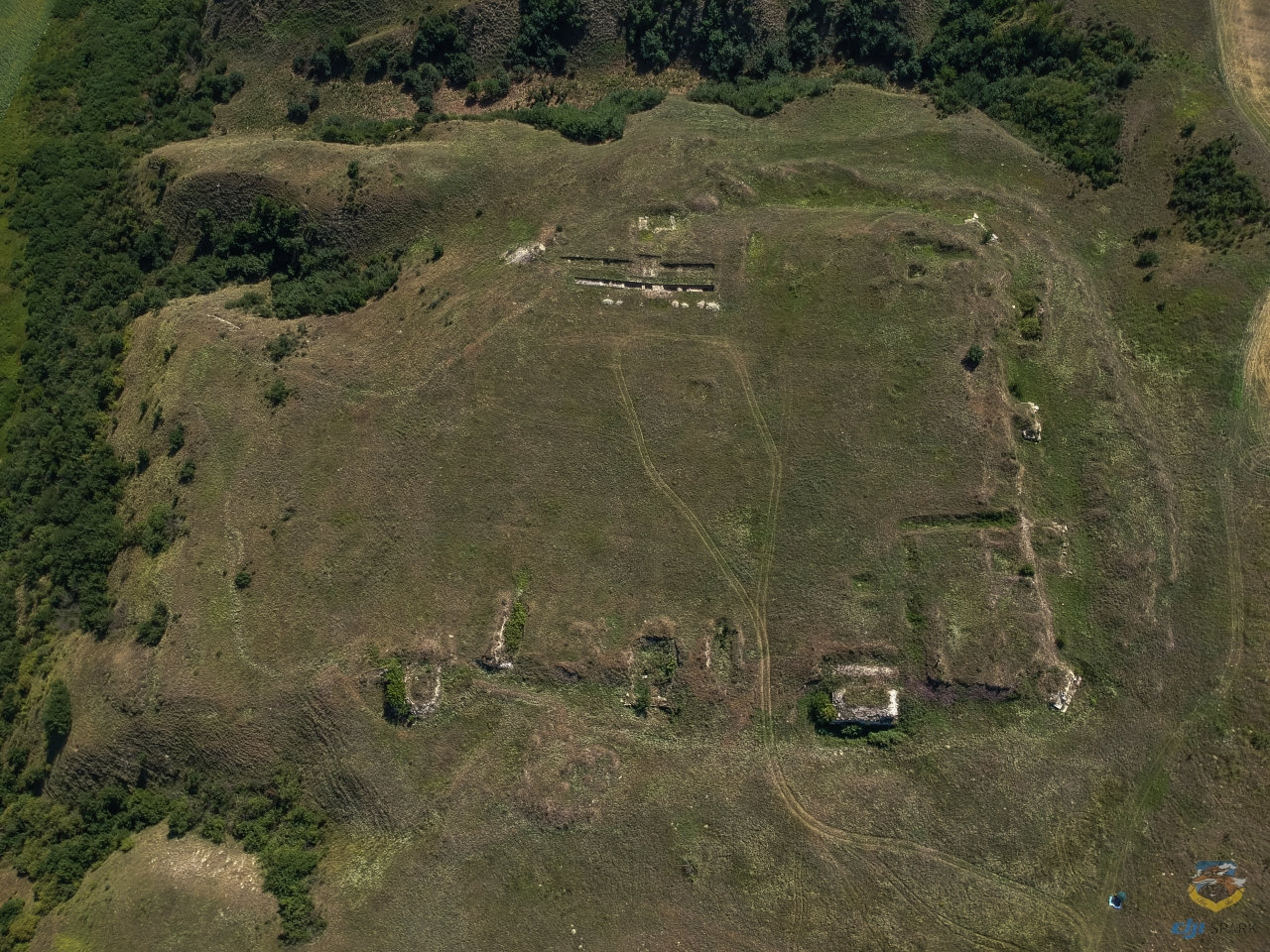
Sacidava

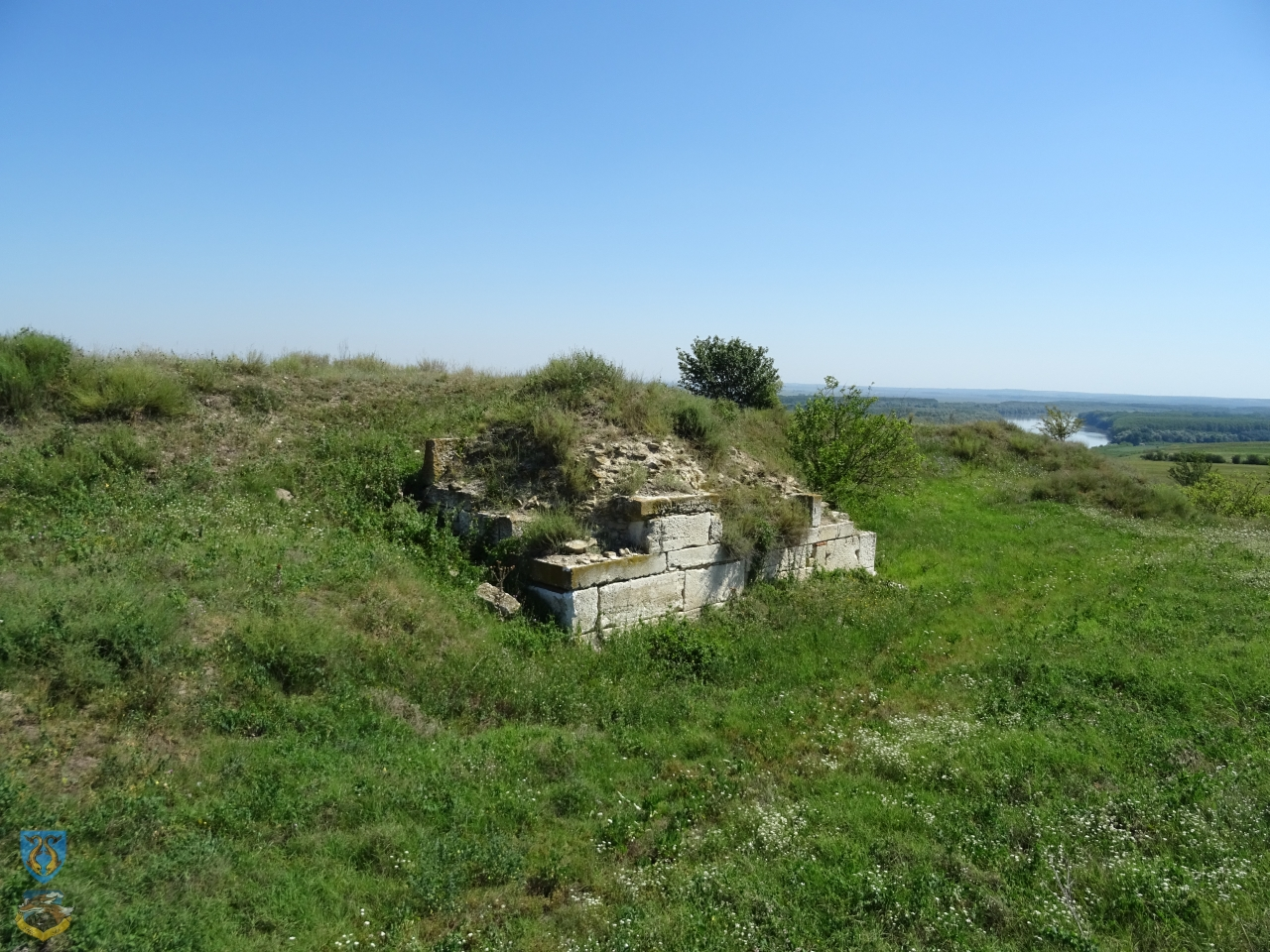
Square tower

Sacidava was a stonebuilt fort in the Roman province of Moesia near the Getic settlement and later Roman city of Sacidava, Moesia that developed around the fort. It is located at Musait between the villages of Rasova and Dunareni, on a high hill on the right bank of the Danube. It is included in the Tabula Peutingeriana as Sagadava and the Notitia Dignitatum as Sacidava.

== History ==
The fort was built in the 2nd century CE as part of the Roman frontier system, the Moesian Limes, in the eastern section later known as the limes Scythiae Minoriae, or Scythian limes. It was an important military outpost serving mainly the city of Civitas Tropaensium and controlling the supply and transport on the Danube limes.

It was built near a former Dacian fort of the Saci tribe which seems to have been their capital from the 4th century BCE until the beginning of the 1st century CE. Toles, their leader, was an ally of Octavian. The fort had several development phases and an uninterrupted evolution from the beginning of the 2nd century CE until the early 7th century CE.

It had a rectangular shape of area about 4 ha. The walls were about 2m wide and the towers were rectangular. The garrison in the 2nd century was Cohors IV Gallorum, Cohors I cilicum sagittariorum milliaria, and later a vexillation of the legion II Herculia de Troesmis (Iglita); later, in the 4-5th centuries, a cuneus equitum scutariorum lived here.

A fire destroyed the fort in the 3rd century, possibly by the Goths. In the 4th century it was rebuilt and an extension of the fortress to the south. At the end of the fourth century a fire destroyed the fort and multiple fires in the fifth century were followed by repeated reconstructions, probably after numerous raids of the Germanic and Hunnic tribes. It flourishing from the beginning of the 6th century and reconstruction on the southern side of the enclosure was in the second half of the 6th century, but later saw another great fire, probably related to the Kutrigur attack in 559. The last years of the fort were between 602-620.

== Archaeology ==
It was discovered and identified by Vasile Parvan. Archaeological research started in 1969 and continued, with some interruptions, until 1980. Archaeology resumed in 2014.

== See also ==
- List of castra § Moesia
