= Docidava =

Dacian fortified settlement

Docidava (Dokidava, Dakidawa?, Ancient Greek: Δοκίδαυα) was a Dacian town in north-western Roman Dacia.

== See also ==
- Dacian davae
- List of ancient cities in Thrace and Dacia
- Dacia
- Roman Dacia
