= Acidava (castra) =

- Castra of Enoșești
- Location within Romania
- 44°22′41″N 24°15′53″E
- Location: Culă Enoșești, Enoșești, Olt, Romania

History
- Founded: 2nd century AD
- Built: Trajan ?

Site notes
- Condition: Ruined

Castra Acidava was a fort in the Roman province of Dacia, The toponym is attested in the Peutinger Table. built near the ancient town of Acidava.

It was part of the Limes Alutanus frontier system built under emperor Hadrian running north–south along the Alutus (Olt) river.

The fort had a quadrangular shape with stone walls about one metre thick, which surrounded an area of 100 m^{2}. The fort housed auxiliary troops from the cohort I Flavia Commagenorum and the I Thracum. A civilian settlement (vicus) developed around it. The fort and the civil settlement functioned between the 2nd and 3rd centuries AD.

The fort was largely destroyed by the building of the railway in 1972.

== See also ==
- List of castra

== Sources ==
- Blejan, Adrian (1998). Dacia Felix – Istoria Daciei Romane (PDF) (in Romanian). Archived from the original (PDF) on 15 March 2012.
