= Tamasidava =

Dacian fortified settlement

Tamasidava (Ancient Greek: Ταμασίδαυα) was a Dacian town mentioned by Ptolemy.

== See also ==
- Dacian davae
- List of ancient cities in Thrace and Dacia
- Dacia
- Roman Dacia
