= Murideva =

Dacian fortified settlement

- Murideba
- Location within Bulgaria
- 43.9°N 27.8°E
- Location: Zaldapa, Bulgaria

Murideva (Murideba, Ancient Greek: Μουριδεβά) was a Dacian town in Scythia Minor, not far from Zaldapa.

== See also ==
- Dacian davae
- List of ancient cities in Thrace and Dacia
- Dacia
- Roman Dacia
