= Acmonia fort =

- Castra of Zăvoi, Agmonia or Agnaviae ?
- Location within Romania
- 45°31′30″N 22°24′20″E
- Location: Balta Neagră – Fâneţe, Zăvoi, Caraș-Severin, Romania

History
- Founded: 2nd century AD
- Built: Trajan

Site notes
- Condition: Ruined

Acmonia fort was a fort in the Roman province of Dacia near the present town of Zavoi, Romania. Later the Roman town of Acmonia grew nearby.

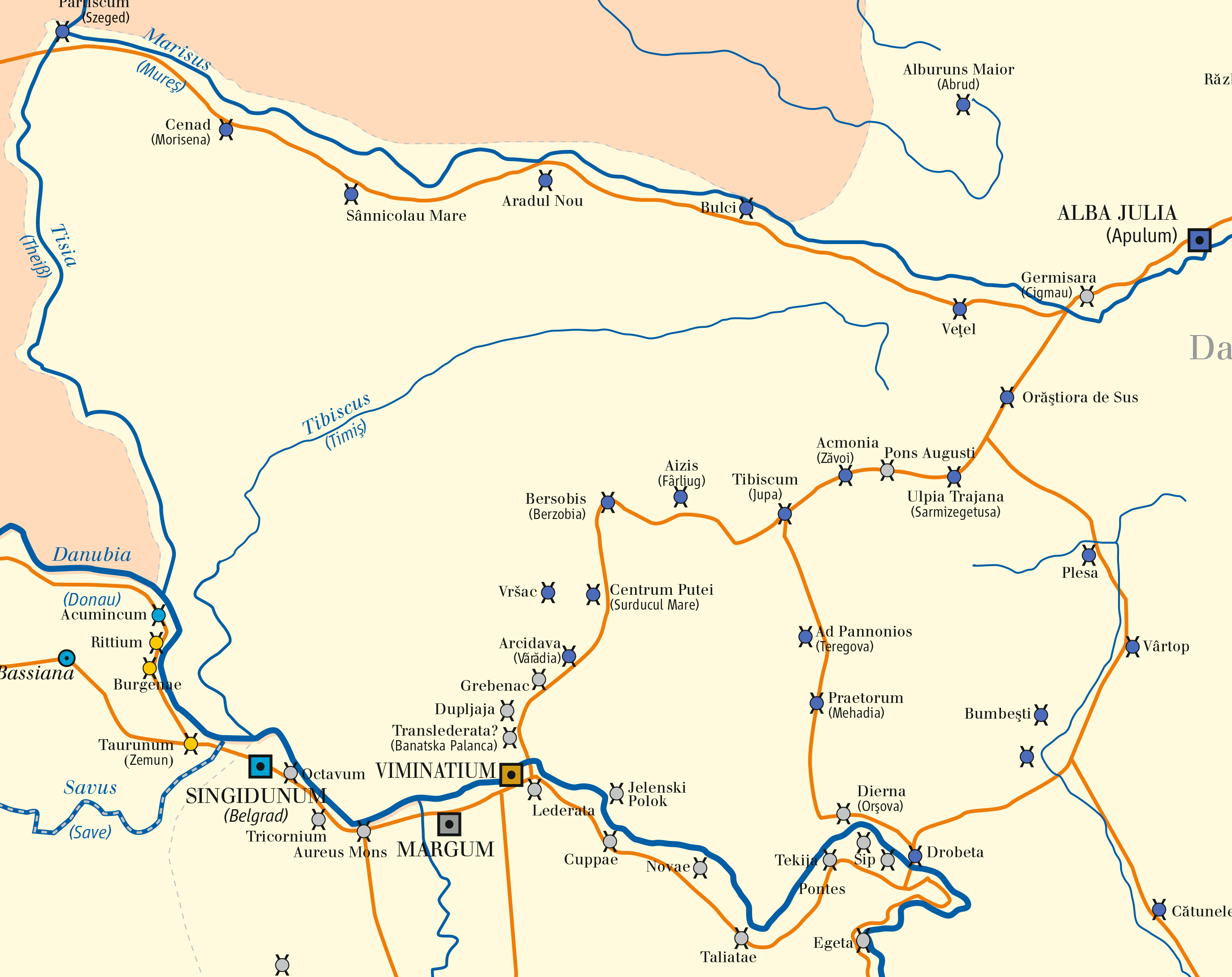
Western Dacia forts

== See also ==
- List of castra

== Notes ==
- Preda, Constantin (coord.), Enciclopedia arheologiei şi istoriei vechi a României vol.1, Editura Enciclopedică, București 1994 ISBN 973-45-0044-9
- Simu, Traian, Drumuri şi cetăţi romane în Banat, Tipografia Naţională, Lugoj 1924
