= Sacidava (Dacia) =

Dacian town

Sacidava (Sacidaba, Acidava) was a Dacian town located between Cedonia and Apulon.

== See also ==
- Dacian davae
- List of ancient cities in Thrace and Dacia
- Dacia
- Roman Dacia
