= Gildava =

Dacian town

Gildava (Gildoba, Gildova, Ancient Greek: Γιλδαβα) was a Dacian town located alongside the Vistula river.

== See also ==
- Dacian davae
- List of ancient cities in Thrace and Dacia
- Dacia
- Roman Dacia
