= Aliman =

- Commune
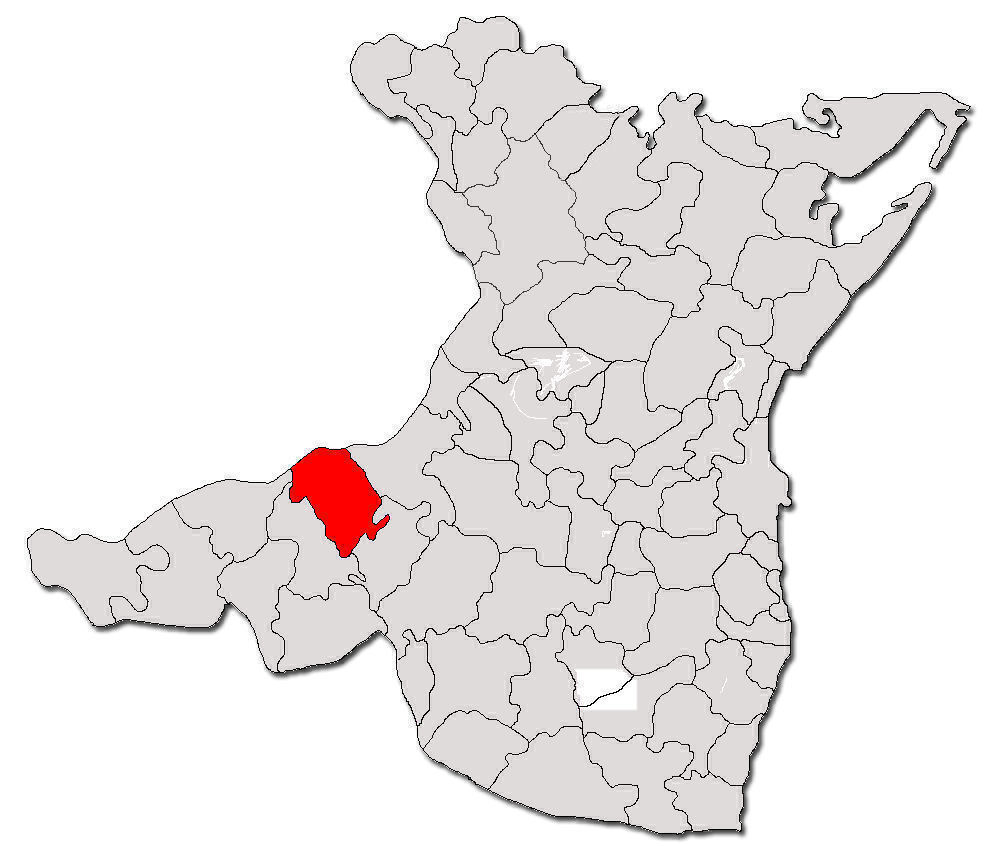
- Location in Constanța County

- Location in Romania
- Coordinates: 44°11′N 27°51′E
- Country: Romania
- County: Constanța
- Subdivisions: Aliman, Dunăreni, Floriile, Vlahii

Government
  - Mayor (2020–2024): George Nicola (PNL)
- Area: 126.21 km^{2} (48.73 sq mi)
- Population (2021-12-01): 2,434
  - Density: 19/km^{2} (50/sq mi)
- Time zone: EET/EEST (UTC+2/+3)
- Vehicle reg.: CT
- Website: www.primaria-aliman.ro

Aliman (Romanian pronunciation: [aliˈman]) is a commune in Constanța County, Northern Dobruja, Romania. It includes four villages:

- Aliman
- Dunăreni (historical name: Mârleanu or Mîrleanu until 1968)
- Floriile (historical name: Bac Cuius, Turkish: Bakkuyusu)
- Vlahii (historical name: Vlahchioi)

The territory of the commune also includes the former village of Adâncata (historical name: Polucci), at 44°9′0″N 27°52′57″E, disestablished by Presidential Decree in 1977.

The Dacian fortress of Sacidava was located close to the village of Dunăreni.

According to Bogdan Petriceicu Hasdeu, in a hypothesis endorsed by Iorgu Iordan, the name Aliman derives from the Turkish word for "German", Alaman or Aleman.

== Demographics ==
At the 2011 census, Aliman had 2,798 Romanians (99.75%), 5 Roma (0.18%), 2 others (0.07%).

== Natives of Aliman ==
- Dan Spătaru, singer
