= Genucla =

Genucla was an ancient fortress of the Getae, located on the bank of the Danube or on an island on the river. In the military campaign of Marcus Licinius Crassus to conquer Moesia, he laid siege to the Genucla fortress which was under the rule of Getaen king Zyraxes.

Dio Cassius said:

After this success he (Marcus Licinius Crassus) did not leave in piece the rest of the Getae, either, even though they had no connexion with Dapyx, but he marched upon Genucla, the most strongly defended fortress of the kingdom of Zyraxes, because he heard that the standards which the Bastarnae had taken from Gaius Antonius (Hybrida) near the city of the Istrians were there. His assault was made both by land and from the Ister (the city is built upon the river), and in a short time, though with much toil, despite the absence of Zyraxes, he took the place. The king, it seems, as soon as he heard of the Romans' approach, had set off with money to the Scythians to seek an alliance, and had not returned in time.

The name of the fortress, in the form "Genuklo", appears also in the texts inscribed on the Sinaia lead plates, discovered in Sinaia at the beginning of the 20th century.
