= Cohors I Aelia Dacorum =

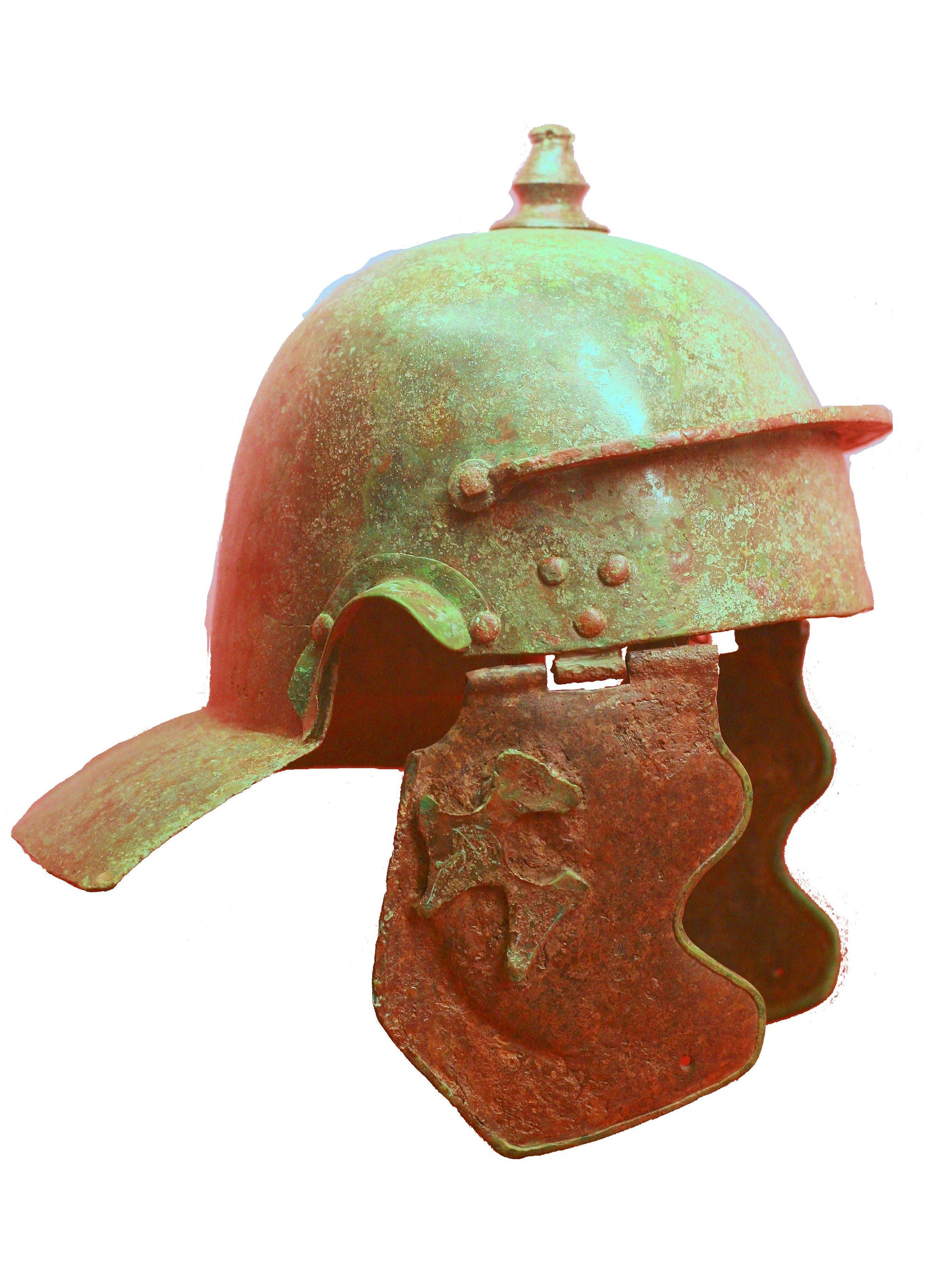
- Roman infantry helmet (late 1st century)
- Active: AD 117–25 to c. 400
- Country: Roman Empire
- Type: Roman auxiliary cohort
- Role: infantry
- Size: 800 (until AD 284)
- Garrison/HQ: Britannia AD 125 – c. 400

Cohors PrimÆ Ælia Dacorvm (Latin name for "1st Aelian Cohort of Dacians") was an infantry regiment of the Auxilia corps of the Imperial Roman army. It was first raised by the Roman emperor Hadrian (r. AD 117–38) in the Roman province of Dacia not later than AD 125 and its last surviving record dates c. 400. It was deployed, for virtually its entire history, in forts on Hadrian's Wall on the northern frontier of Britannia province.

== Foundation ==
The regiment carries the epithet Aelia, implying that it was either founded, or honoured for valour, by the emperor Hadrian (Publius Ælius Hadrianus). It was probably founded between AD 117 (the date of Hadrian's accession) and c. 125, the date of the unit's first datable attestation. The Dacorum name suggests that its initial recruits were mainly ethnic Dacians from Moesia and/or the recently conquered Roman province of Dacia (annexed in 106 by Hadrian's predecessor, Trajan). As no record of the unit has been found in Dacia, Holder argues that the regiment was transferred to Britain immediately after it was established. (This was in accordance with a general imperial policy of deploying auxiliary units far from recently conquered (or pacified) regions in order to assure their loyalty: thus, seven British regiments, raised during the Flavian period (71–96), are attested as deployed in Dacia in the reign of Hadrian).

== Structure ==
The regiment was probably of milliaria strength (i.e., 800-strong), divided into ten centuriae of 80 men each. Although only one of its records mentions its milliaria status, the latter is supported by the fact that all but the first of its attested commanders carried the title of tribunus, normally an indication of milliaria status.

The fact that the unit's first surviving record (c. 125) attests a Cohors I Dacorum (without the Ælia title), and that its commander at the time, Marcus Cludius Severus, held the rank of praefectus, has led to the suggestion that it was originally a quingenaria regiment (480-strong, divided into six centuriae) and that it acquired its Ælia title when it was upgraded to milliaria status in 127.

There is no evidence that the unit ever acquired a cavalry contingent: in no inscription is the regiment ascribed the epithet "EQ" (for equitata = "equipped with cavalry"), and no cavalry officer (decurion) or trooper (eques) is attested.

== Garrisons ==
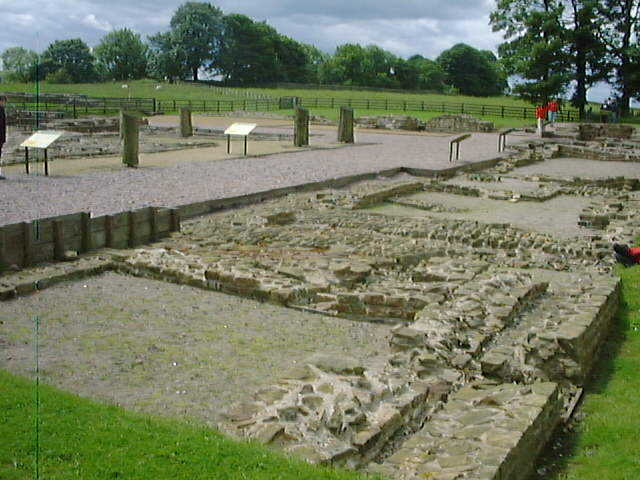
Partial view of excavated remains of Roman Fort Banna (at Birdoswald, Cumbria, England). Cohors I Ælia Dacorum was stationed here for at least 150 years until AD 276, and probably for about a century thereafter

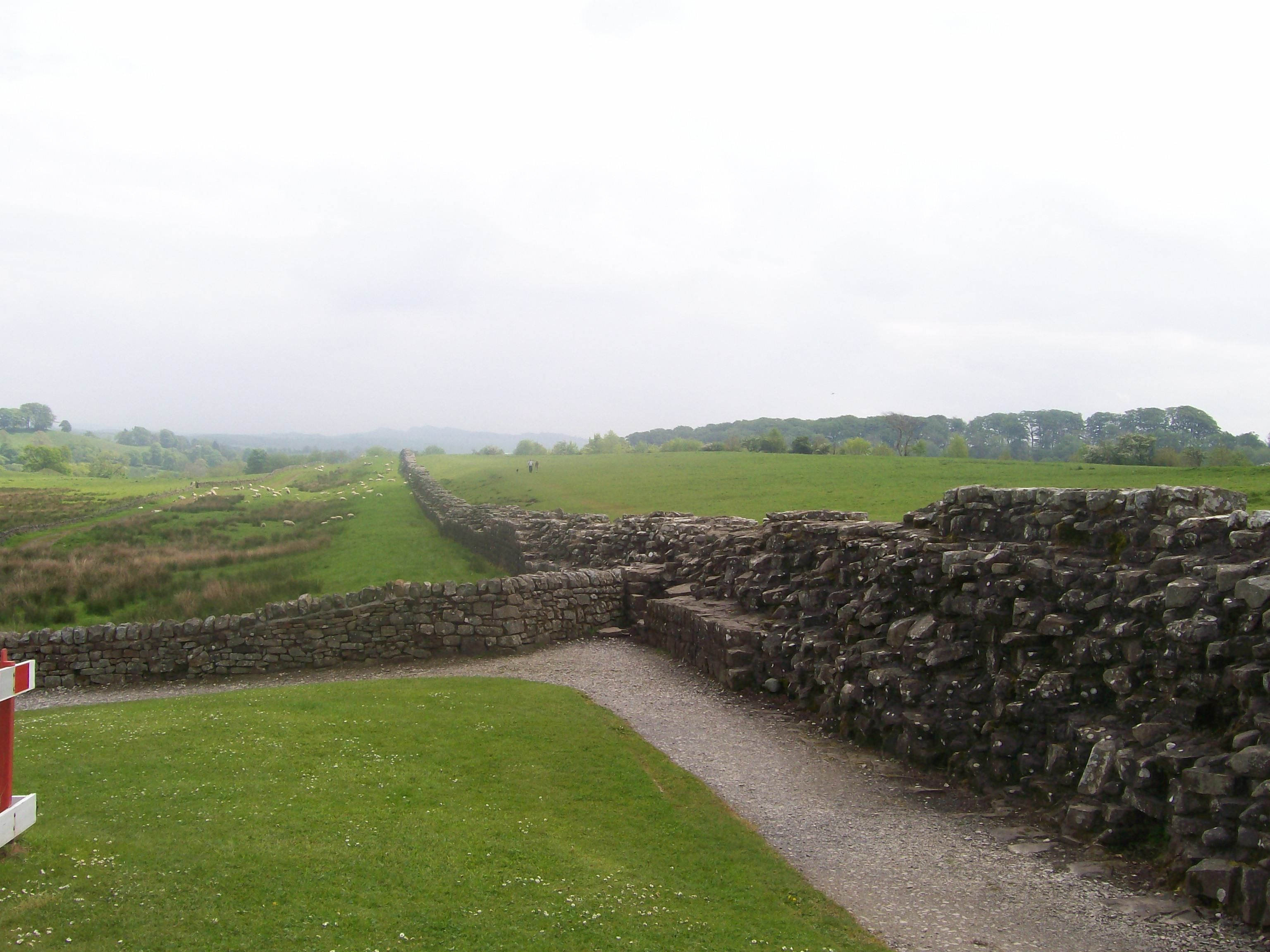
View of the remains of Hadrian's Wall (right, stretching into the distance), as seen from Fort Banna. Originally, the wall was c. 5 m (16 ft) high, but stone removal over the centuries has reduced its remains, at this point, to barely 2 m

The Regiment was transferred from Dacia to Britain not later than 125, when it was stationed briefly at Fort Fanum Cocidi (Bewcastle, Cumbria) and appears to have participated in the excavation of the so-called Vallum, a huge ditch running along the near side of Hadrian's Wall (constructed 122–8). It was permanently stationed at Fort Banna (Birdoswald, Cumbria), on Hadrian's Wall, from 126 to at least 276/82, where it is attested in numerous inscriptions.

The inscription of 276/82 is one of the latest datable record found which mentions I Aelia Dacorum. However, a later inscription found at Fort Banna, datable to the latter period of the emperor Diocletian's rule (293–305), records that the fort's headquarters buildings, which had fallen into ruins, were rebuilt under the direction of the centurion Flavius Martinus, who is described as praepositus cohortis ("cohort acting-commander"). The fact that the fort was in ruins and then repaired suggests that it may have been abandoned for a period, and then re-occupied. The text is incomplete, therefore it is uncertain whether Martinus commanded I Aelia Dacorum, or some other regiment.

The regiment is recorded in the Notitia Dignitatum, a late 4th-century official document which contains a list of Roman military units in existence around AD 400, as stationed at Camboglanna (Castlesteads, Cumbria), the fort on Hadrian's Wall neighbouring Banna to the west. This record shows that the regiment was probably present in Britain until the definitive withdrawal of Roman troops from the island in c. 410. By this time, the unit probably contained only c. 300 effectives, around a third of its size in the 2nd century. This reduction was in line with the army in Britain as a whole, which had shrunk from a peak of c. 55,000 in 200 to c. 17,500 effectives in 400.

== Campaigns ==
In view of its size and long-term stationing on the northern British frontier, facing the unconquered Caledonia (Scotland), the regiment almost certainly participated in all the major campaigns recorded in this turbulent region, including:

- 139–42: Antoninus Pius (r. 138–61) launches an aggressive strategy to re-occupy the Scottish Lowlands, as far as the Forth-Clyde line, which had been abandoned under the emperor Trajan (r. 98–117). Governor Quintus Lollius Urbicus leads the campaign. Coins record victory in 142/3 over the Caledonian tribes of the region, especially the Selgovae. The campaign is followed by the construction of the Antonine Wall.
- 154–8: Serious disturbances break out in northern Britain, probably centred on a revolt by the Brigantes, most of whom reside south of Hadrian's Wall. The Romans are forced to withdraw troops from the Antonine Wall to suppress the revolt. This campaign probably led to the decision to abandon the Antonine Wall by 162.
- 181–5: The Caledonian tribes overrun Hadrian's Wall. The emperor Commodus (r. 180–92) rushes reinforcements under Lucius Ulpius Marcellus to repel the invasion. In 184, Commodus assumes the title Britannicus to celebrate victory.
- 196–7: The governor of Britain, Decimus Clodius Albinus, launches a bid to seize imperial power. He leads the British army to Gaul to challenge the Danubian army under emperor Lucius Septimius Severus (r. 193–211). Frere argues that Albinus would probably have needed to take virtually every single Roman soldier from Britain for his campaign (his army reportedly numbered 150,000, but this is probably an exaggeration, as the entire army in Britain at this time probably totalled c. 50,000. Also, Albinus failed to win the support of the Rhine army). Albinus and his army were defeated in a hard-fought battle at Lugdunum (Lyon) and Albinus executed.
- 208–11: Emperor Septimius Severus launches a massive campaign to conquer the whole of Caledonia, similar to that of governor Gnaeus Julius Agricola in 77–85, over a century earlier. However, from the evidence of Severan-era marching-camps along the east coast of Scotland, it does not appear that Severus' army advanced as far as north as Agricola's, which had reached Inverness. Severus' gains were abandoned by his son and successor Caracalla (r. 211–8).

== Honours ==
The epigraphic record shows that, during the 2nd and 3rd centuries, the regiment won five more imperial titles, presumably for valour, or for loyalty to the awarding emperor:

1. Antoniniana: this title, attested in an inscription dated 218–22, could, in view of the name, have been accorded by Antoninus Pius, Marcus Aurelius Commodus or Septimius Severus. However, it appears that in 212–3, several regiments in Britain were accorded the title. Frere argues that these awards were made by the emperor Caracalla (M. Aurelius Severus Antoninus, r. 211–17), in order to secure the British regiments' loyalty after the assassination of his brother and co-emperor Geta, who enjoyed wide popularity in the army.
2. Gordiana (Gordian III r. 238 )
3. Postumiana (Postumus r. 260–9)
4. Tetriciana (Tetricus I r. 269–74)
5. Probiana (Probus r. 276–82)

The awards show that, in the period 260–74, the regiment gave its allegiance to the "Gallic" emperors Postumus and Tetricus I, who ruled the breakaway western section of the Empire (comprising Gaul, Spain and Britain), known as the "Gallic Empire".

== Religious cults ==
Of the 27 stone altars found at the cohort's long-term fort (at Birdoswald, Cumbria), 24 are dedicated to Jupiter, the highest Roman god, originally the supreme sky-god of the Indo-Europeans. These are headed with the initials "IOM", for Iovi Optimo Maximo ("to Jupiter the Best and Greatest"). One of these was jointly dedicated to Jupiter and to the numen ("Divine Spirit") of the first emperor Augustus, who was officially deified after his death. One altar is dedicated to the Roman god of war Mars and one to the god of the sea, Neptune.

Only one altar was dedicated to a native British deity, the Celtic god Cocidius (after whom the fort occupied by the cohort before Banna was named: Fanum Cocidi, meaning "Shrine of Cocidius", at Bewcastle, Cumbria).

However, these dedications are in no way representative of the religious affiliation of the regiment's members, as they were all erected by the cohort's tribunes (commanding officers). They thus represent the army's official cults. The cohort's soldiers doubtless revered a great variety of British and other native deities.

== Attested Personnel ==
Datable personnel of Cohors I Aelia Dacorum
Date of inscription	Name	Military Rank	Social Status	Nation/tribe	Birthplace	Notes
c 125	Marcus Clu(dius?) Severus	Praefectus	Roman knight	Italian	Cesena	Severus, in a funerary stone from Cesena, is described as praefectus of the cohort. Cludius name fits gap in inscription and is attested in votive inscription from Dacia
c. 150	Ti. Claudius Proculus Cornelianus	Tribunus	Roman knight	prob. Numidian		Previously commanded Cohors II Bracarum (in Moesia Inferior?); subsequently (153–6) commanded Ala Sulpicia in Germania Inferior
c. 160	Domitius Honoratus	Tribunus	Roman knight	prob. Bithynian	Prusias ad Hypium?	
205-7	Aurelius Iulianus	Tribunus	Roman knight	British?		
219	Marcus Claudius Menander	Tribunus	Roman knight	prob. Greek (from Asia Minor)	Ephesus?	A Sextus Claudius Menander attested in Ephesus
235-8	Flavius Maximianus	Tribunus	Roman knight	Italian?	Praeneste (Latium)?	evocatus (veteran) of Cohors I Praetoria (cohort of Praetorian Guard)
237	Aurelius Faustus	Tribunus	Roman knight	Dacian?		A veteran with same name attested in Dacia
258-69	Marcius Gallicus	Tribunus	Roman knight			
258-69	Probius Augendus	Tribunus	Roman knight			
270-4	Pomponius Desideratus	Tribunus	Roman knight	Gaul?		name attested 6 X in late Gaul
276-82	Aurelius Vinus	Tribunus	Roman knight			
XXXX
c. 125	Aelius Dida	Centurion	Roman citizen			
c. 126	Decius Saxa	Centurion	Roman citizen?			
293-305	Flavius Martinus	Centurion (of I Aelia Dac.?)	Roman citizen			

Undated personnel of Cohors I Aelia Dacorum
	Name	Military Rank	Social Status	Nation/tribe	Birthplace	Notes
Octavius Honoratus	Tribunus	Roman knight	Numidian?			
Reginius Iustinus	Tribunus	Roman knight	Gaul or Briton?		Acc. to E. Birley, "fabricated" name suggests Celtic origin	
Statius Longinus	Tribunus	Roman knight	Italian?	Canusium?		
Iulius Saturninus	Tribunus	Roman knight				
Terentius Valerianus	Tribunus	Roman knight	Italian?	Novara?	?Same as Caius Terentius Valerianus who erected tombstone to son at Novara?	
Funisulanus Vettonianus	Tribunus	Roman knight	Italian?			
Ammonius Victorinus	Tribunus	Roman knight				
Congaonius Candidus	Centurion		prob. Gaul or Briton			

Dependants of Cohors I Aelia Dacorum personnel
Date of inscription	Name	Social status	Nation/tribe	Birthplace	Record find-spot	Record type
205-7	Aurelius Concordus	child (of tribune Aurelius Iulianus), died at 1 year			Birdoswald	Tombstone, erected by father
uncertain	Decibalus; Blaesus	child, died days after birth child (brother of Decibalus), died at 10 years	uncertain (Dacian name) uncertain (Roman name)		Birdoswald	Tombstone, erected by elder brother

== See also ==
- List of Roman auxiliary regiments
