= Acmonia, Dacia =

Ancient Dacian town

Acmonia (Akmonia, Ancient Greek: Ἀκμωνία) was a Dacian town mentioned by Ptolemy. near the present town of Zavoi. The Roman fort of Acmonia was nearby.

== See also ==
- Dacian davae
- List of ancient cities in Thrace and Dacia
- Dacia
- Roman Dacia
