= Ramidava =

Dacian fortified settlement

Ramidava (Ancient Greek: Ραμίδαυα) was a Dacian town.

== See also ==
- Dacian davae
- List of ancient cities in Thrace and Dacia
- Dacia
- Roman Dacia
