= Sacidava, Moesia =

Ancient Getic settlement in Romania

Sacidava (Moesia)
- Sagadava
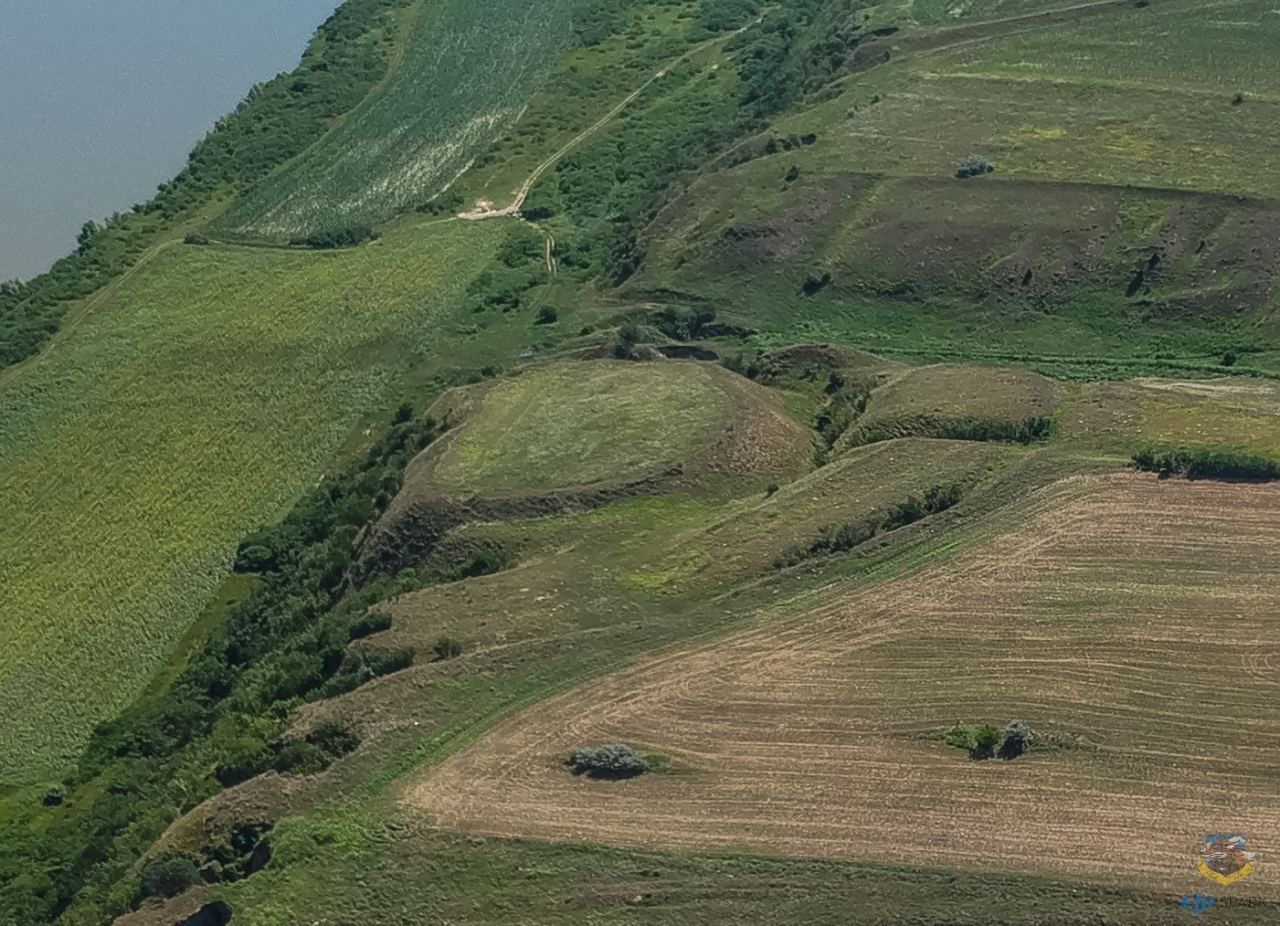

- Location within Romania
- 44.240245°N 27.848985°E
- Location: Dunăreni, Constanța, Romania

Site notes
- Elevation: 66 m (217 ft)

Sacidava was an ancient Getic settlement on the Danube, between Durostorum and Axiopolis, located near the modern village of Izvoarele, in Romania.

The ancient Roman fort of Sacidava (castra) is located nearby.

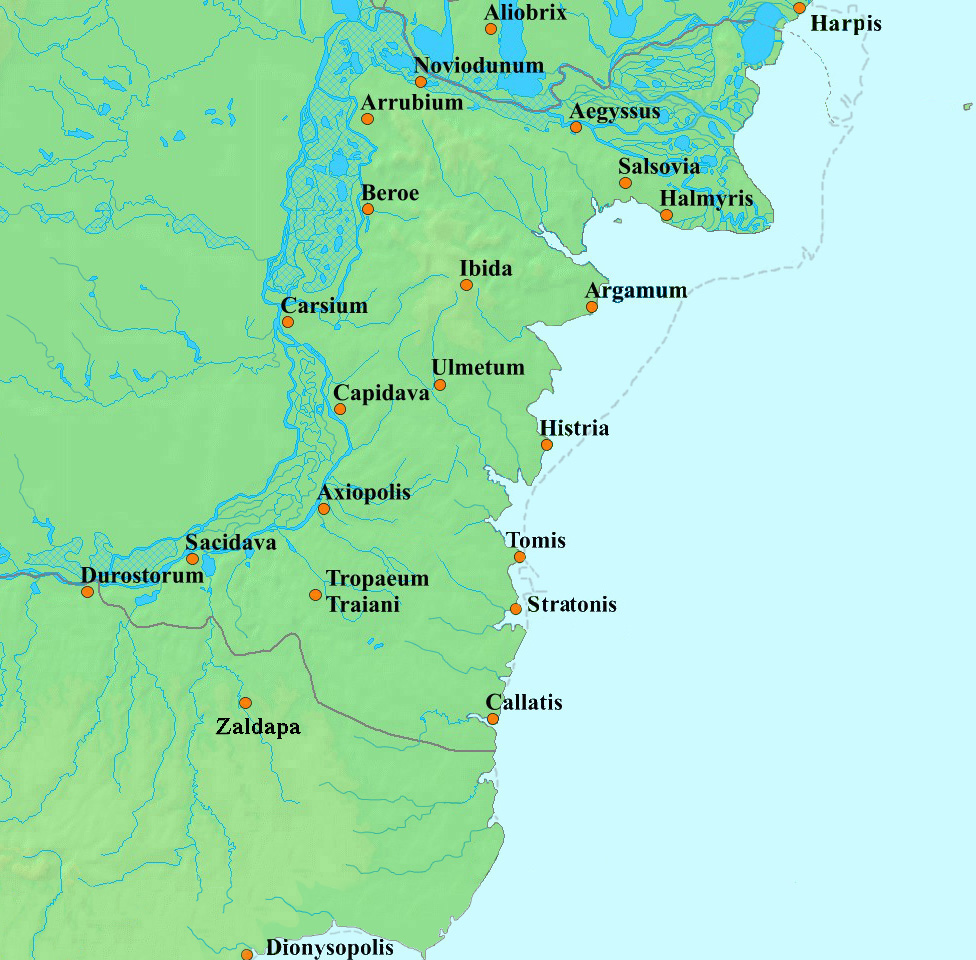
Moesian Limes and Scythia Minor

== See also ==
- Dacian davae
- List of ancient cities in Thrace and Dacia
- Dacia
- Roman Dacia
