= Giridava =

Dacian town

- Giridaua, Geridava
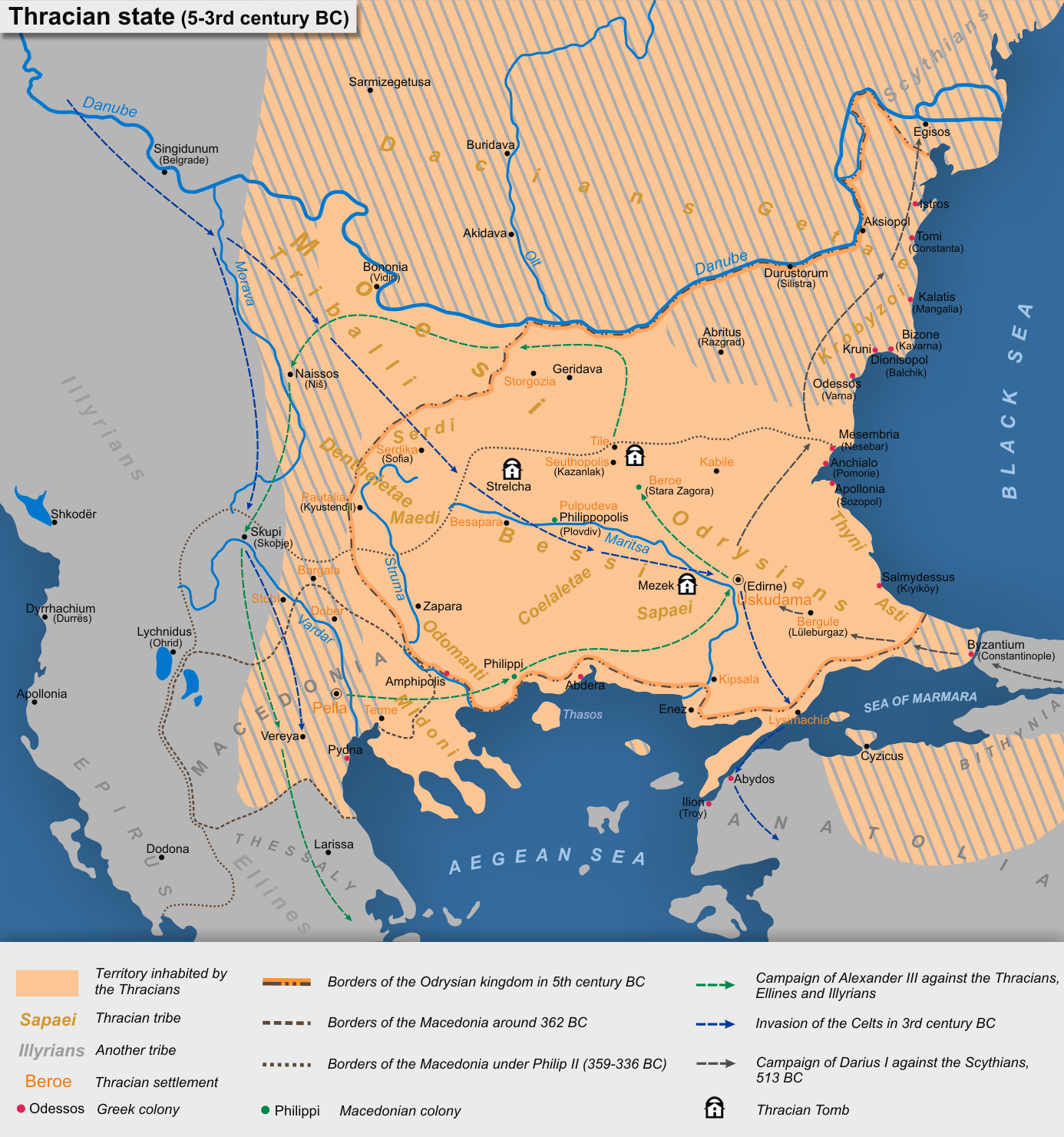

- Location within Bulgaria
- 43.2873°N 24.8511°E
- Location: Drenov?, Bulgaria

Giridava (Giridaua, Geridava) was a Dacian town, situated in Moesia, modern northern Bulgaria.

== See also ==
- Dacian davae
- List of ancient cities in Thrace and Dacia
- Dacia
- Roman Dacia
