= Quemedava =

Dacian fortified settlement

Quemedava was an ancient Dacian city in Dardania mentioned by Procopius.

== See also ==
- Dacian davae
- List of ancient cities in Illyria
- List of ancient cities in Thrace and Dacia
- Dacia
- Roman Dacia
