= Zyraxes =

1st century BC Dacian Getae king

- King of Dacia
- Reign: 1st century BC
- Born: cca. 93 BC.
- Died: cca. 28 BC.

Zyraxes was a Getae king who ruled the northern and western part of what is today Dobrogea in the 1st century BC. He was mentioned in relation with the campaigns of Marcus Licinius Crassus (grandson of the triumvir). His capital, Genucla, was besieged by the Romans in 28 BC, but he managed to escape and flee to his Scythian allies.

Earlier, Antonius Hybrida, the governor of Moesia, led his army into Zyraxes’ kingdom, part of which extended into eastern Moesia, but he was defeated beneath the walls of Histria in 61 BC. The Getae under Zyraxes, together with the Bastarnae of Scythia, were allied with the Histrians; however, the primary victors of the conflict appear to have been the Getae, for they claimed the battle trophies and carried them back to Genucla, Zyraxes’ capital.

The trophies were recovered by Marcus Licinius Crassus when he attacked the Genucla fortress, situated somewhere on the bank of the Danube, in 28 BC. Zyraxes knew he could not withstand the enemy alone, so he withdrew across the Danube to the Bastarnae (Scythians), with whom he shared both alliances and territorial influence, taking his treasure with him. In his absence, the fortress fell after a short but fierce siege.
