= Aedava =

Dacian settlement in Bulgaria

- Aedeva, Aedabe, Aedeba, Aedadeba
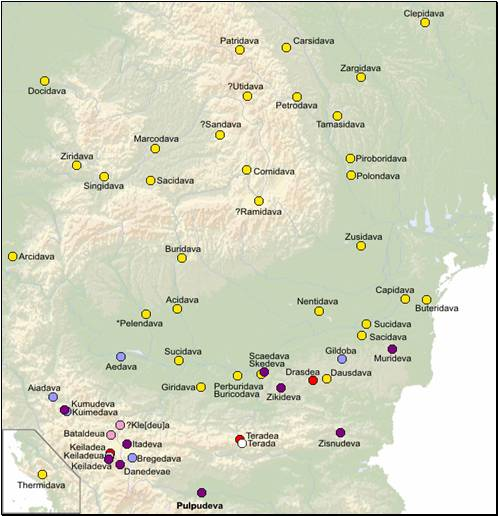
- Map of Dacian settlements.
- Interactive map of Aedava
- 43.737°N 23.867°E
- Location: Bulgaria

Aedava (also known as Aedeva, Aedabe, Aedeba, Aedadeba) was a Dacian settlement located south of the Danube in Moesia (present-day northern Bulgaria). In his De Aedificiis, the 6th century AD historian Procopius placed Aedava on the Danubian road between Augustae and Variana. He also mentioned that Emperor Justinian (r. 527–565) restored the damaged portion of the town defenses.

== See also ==
- Dacia
- Moesia
- List of ancient cities in Thrace and Dacia
