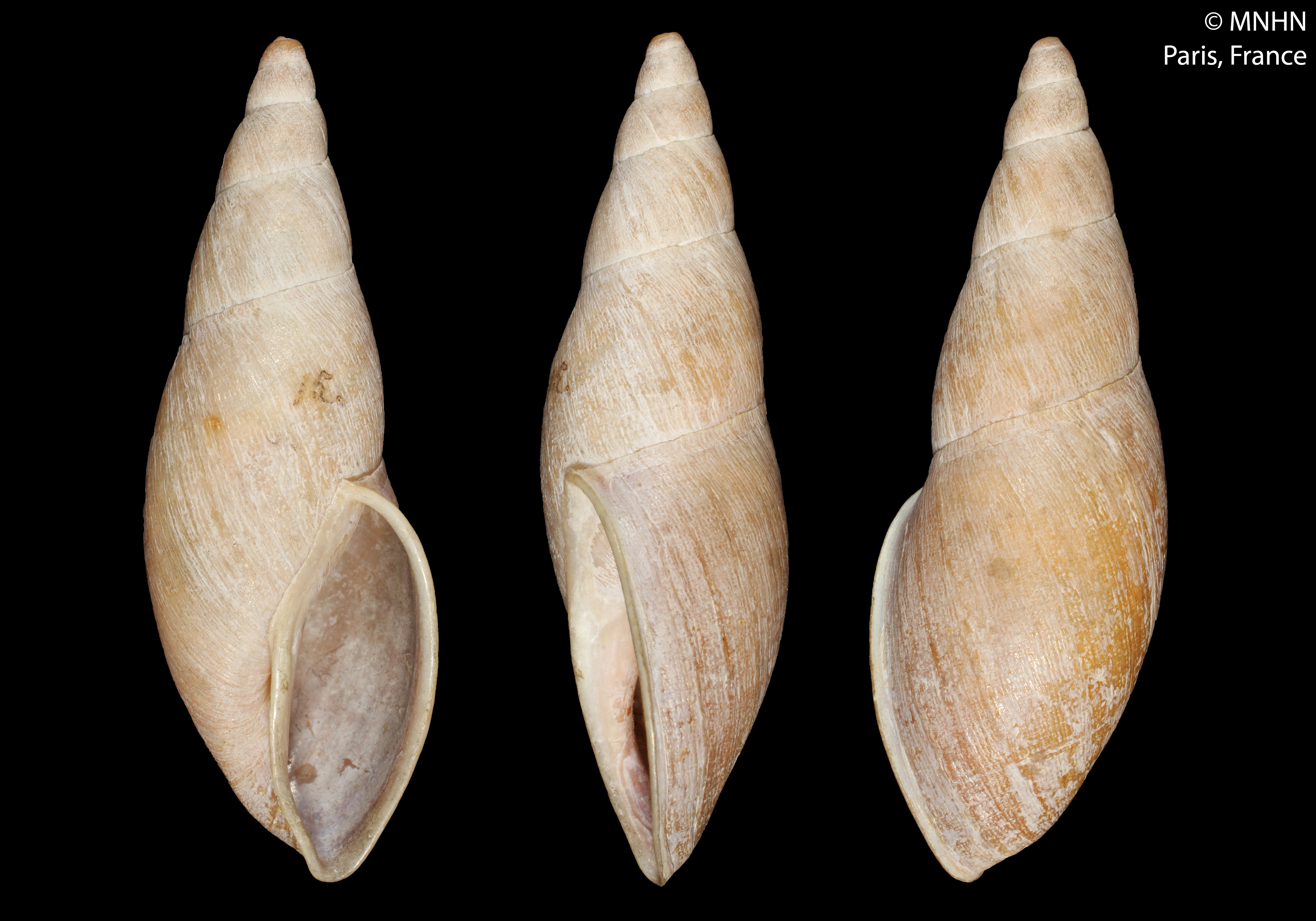
- Shell of † Apula goniostoma (syntype at MNHN, Paris)

Scientific classification
- Domain: Eukaryota
- Kingdom: Animalia
- Phylum: Mollusca
- Class: Gastropoda
- Order: Stylommatophora
- Infraorder: Helicoidei
- Superfamily: Helicoidea
- Family: Elonidae
- Genus: †Apula; C. R. Boettger, 1909

Synonyms
- † Apula (Steklovia) Schlickum & Strauch, 1972 (junior subjective synonym); † Hygromia (Apula) C. R. Boettger, 1909; † Klikia (Apula) C. R. Boettger, 1909 (considered as a separate genus); † Klikia (Steklovia) Schlickum & Strauch, 1972 (junior subjective synonym); † Steklovia Schlickum & Strauch, 1972 (junior subjective synonym)

= Apula =

Extinct genus of gastropods

Apula is an extinct genus of air-breathing land snail, a terrestrial pulmonate gastropod mollusk in the subfamily Klikiinae † of the family Elonidae.

== Species ==
- † Apula amberti (Michaud, 1855)
- † Apula catantostoma (F. Sandberger, 1872)
- † Apula coarctata (Klein, 1853)
- † Apula devexa (Reuss, 1861)
- † Apula escoffierae (Fontannes, 1881)
- † Apula fraudulosa (Steklov, 1966)
- † Apula goniostoma (Sandberger, 1872)
- † Apula koehnei (Schlickum & Strauch, 1972)
- † Apula magna (Lueger, 1981)
- † Apula planispira (Lueger, 1981)
- † Apula steinheimensis (Jooss, 1918)
- † Apula vindobonensis (Harzhauser & H. Binder, 2004)
