= Cedonia (castra) =

Fort in the Roman province of Dacia

- Cedonie, Cedoniae
- Location within Romania
- 45°48′N 24°11′E
- Location: Sibiu ?, Sibiu, Romania

Cedonia was a fort in the Roman province of Dacia.

== See also ==
- List of castra
