= Dava (Dacian) =

Dacian fortified settlement

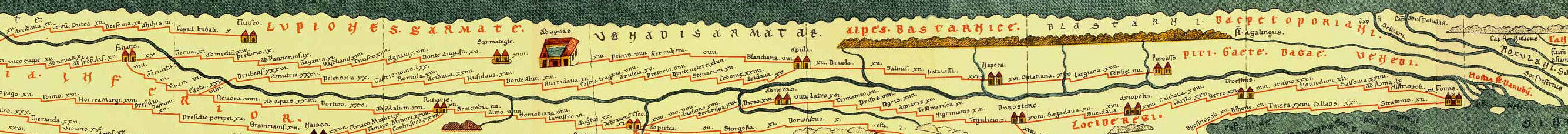
Many davae on the Roman Dacia selection from Tabula Peutingeriana

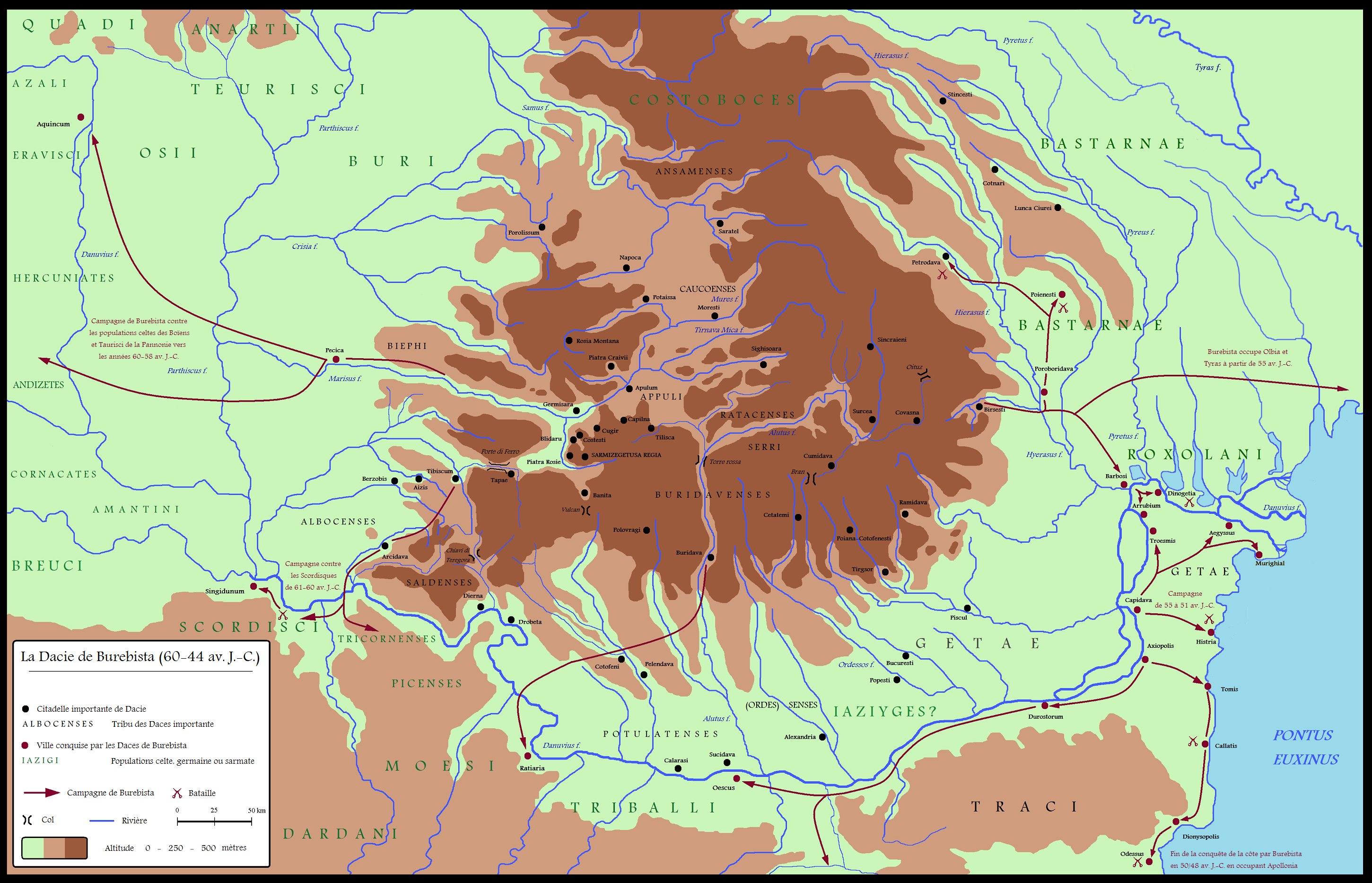
Davae in Dacia during Burebista

Dava (Latinate plural davae) was a Geto-Dacian name for a city, town or fortress. Generally, the name indicated a tribal center or an important settlement, usually fortified. Some of the Dacian settlements and the fortresses employed the Murus Dacicus traditional construction technique.

Most of these towns are attested by Ptolemy, and therefore date from at least the 1st century CE.

The dava towns can be found as south as the cities of Sandanski and Plovdiv in present-day Bulgaria. Strabo specified that the Dacians ("Daci") are the Getae. The Dacians, Getae and their kings were always considered as Thracians by the ancients (Dio Cassius, Trogus Pompeius, Appian, Strabo, Herodotus and Pliny the Elder), and were both said to speak the same Thracian language.

== Etymology ==
Many city names of the Dacians were composed of an initial lexical element (often the tribe name) affixed to -dava, -daua, -deva, -deba, -daba or -dova (<PIE *dʰeh₁-, "to set, place"). Therefore, dava "town" derived from the reconstructed proto-Indo-European *dhewa "settlement". A non-Indo European, Kartvelian solution has also been briefly mentioned, but dismissed as a random occurrence (Tomaschek 1893, p. 139) e.g., see comparison with modern Georgian დაბა (daba), "town, village".

== List of davae ==
Below is a list of Dacian towns which include various forms of dava in their name:

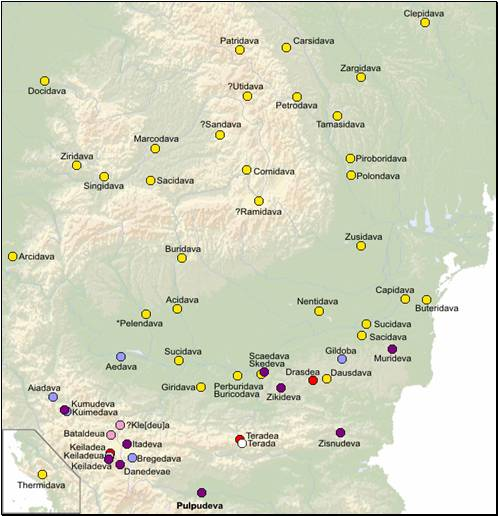
Onomastic range of the Dacian towns with the -dava ending, covering Dacia, Moesia, Thrace and Dalmatia

- Acidava (Acidaua), a fortress town close to the Danube. Located in today's Enoșești, Olt County, Romania
- Aedava (Aedeva, Aedabe, Aedeba or Aedadeba), placed by Procopius on the Danubian road between Augustae and Variana, in Moesia (the present Northern Bulgaria)
- Aiadava (Aiadaba or Aeadaba, Greek: Αἰάδαβα), was a locality in the Remesiana region, present Bela Palanka, Serbia.
- Argedava (Argedauon, Sargedava, Sargedauon, Zargedava, Zargedauon, Ancient Greek: Αργεδαυον, Σαργεδαυον), mentioned in the Decree of Dionysopolis, potentially the dava discovered at Popești, a district in the town of Mihăilești, Giurgiu County, Romania and maybe Burebista's court/capital
- Argidava (Argidaua, Arcidava, Arcidaua, Argedava, Argedauon, Sargedava, Sargedauon, Zargedava, Zargedauon, Ancient Greek: Ἀργίδαυα, Αργεδαυον, Σαργεδαυον), potentially Burebista's court/capital, located in today's Vărădia, Caraș-Severin County, Romania
- Bregedaba
- Buricodava
- Buridava or Burridava, today's Ocnele Mari, Romania
- Buteridava
- Capidava or Kapidaua, a fortress town on the southern side of the lower Danube
- Carsidava or Karsidaua
- Cumidava, Comidava or Komidaua, ancient Râșnov, Romania
- Dausdava, Dausadava or Dausdavua, "The shrine of wolves", a fortress town close to the Danube
- Desudaba
- Docidava or Dokidaua
- Gildova or Gildoba, located alongside the Vistula river
- Giridava
- Itadeba or Itadava, in north eastern North Macedonia
- Jidava, near Câmpulung Muscel, Romania
- Jidova
- Klepidaua
- Kuimedaba
- Marcodava or Markodaua
- Murideba
- Nentinava or Netindaua, ancient Slobozia, Romania
- Nentivava, ancient Oltenița, Romania
- Patridava or Patridaua
- Pelendava or Pelendova, ancient Craiova, Romania
- Perburidava
- Petrodava or Petrodaua located in Piatra Neamţ
- Piroboridava or Piroboridaua
- Pulpudeva, originally named Eumolpias by the Dacians. Philip II of Macedon conquered the area in 342–341 BC and renamed the city Philippoupolis (Greek: Φιλιππούπολις), of which the later Dacian name for the city, Pulpu-deva, is a reconstructed translation. Today's city of Plovdiv in Bulgaria.
- Quemedava, mentioned by Procopius in Dardania
- Ramidava or Rhamidaua
- Recidava
- Rusidava or Rusidava
- Sacidava or Sacidaba
- Sagadava
- Sandava
- Sangidaua
- Scaidava or Skedeba
- Setidava or Setidaua, mentioned by Ptolemy as a thriving settlement
- Singidava or Singidaua
- Sucidava, Suvidava or Sukidaua located in Corabia, Olt County, Romania
- Susudava, mentioned by Ptolemy as a thriving settlement
- Sykidaba
- Tamasidava or Tamasidaua
- Thermidava, placed by Ptolemy on the Lissus-Naissus route. The toponym is most probably a misreading of a settlement which most scholars in contemporary research locate near present-day Banat, Serbia.
- Utidava or Utidaua
- Zargidava or Zargidaua
- Ziridava or Ziridaua
- Zisnedeva, Zisnudeva or Zisnudeba, located in Dacian Moesia
- Zucidaua
- Zisnudeba
- Zusidava

== See also ==
- List of ancient cities in Thrace and Dacia
- Dacian language
- Dacia
- Polis
- Deva
- Oppidum
