= Origin of the Romanians =

Ethnogenesis of Romanians

Several theories, in great extent mutually exclusive, address the issue of the origin of the Romanians. The Romanian language descends from the Vulgar Latin dialects spoken in the Roman provinces north of the "Jireček Line" (a proposed notional line separating the predominantly Latin-speaking territories from the Greek-speaking lands in Southeastern Europe) in Late Antiquity. The theory of Daco-Roman continuity argues that the Romanians are mainly descended from the Daco-Romans, a people developing through the cohabitation of the native Dacians and the Roman colonists in the province of Dacia Traiana (primarily in present-day Romania) north of the river Danube. The competing immigrationist theory states that the Romanians' ethnogenesis commenced in the provinces south of the river with Romanized local populations like Thraco-Romans and Illyro-Romans (known as Vlachs in the Middle Ages) spreading through mountain refuges, both south to Greece and north through the Carpathian Mountains. Other theories state that the Romanized local populations were present over a wide area on both sides of the Danube and the river itself did not constitute an obstacle to permanent exchanges in both directions; according to the "admigration" theory, migrations from the Balkan Peninsula to the lands north of the Danube contributed to the survival of the Romance-speaking population in these territories.

Political motivations—the Transylvanian Romanians' efforts to achieve their emancipation, Austro-Hungarian and Romanian expansionism, and Hungarian irredentism—influenced the development of the theories, and "national passions" still color the debates. In 2013, authors of The Cambridge History of the Romance Languages came to the conclusion that the "historical, archaeological and linguistic data available do not seem adequate to give a definitive answer" in the debate. Their view was accepted by scholars contributing to The Oxford Guide to the Romance Languages, published in 2016, which reiterates that "the location and extent of the territory where "Daco-Romance" originated" is uncertain.

== Historical background ==
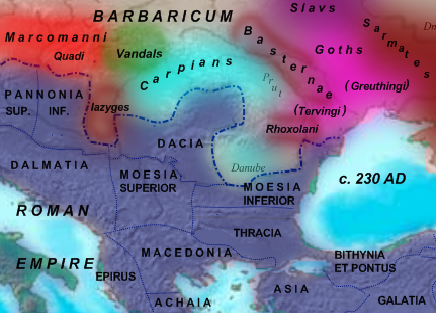
Roman provinces (dark blue) in Southeastern Europe, c. 200 AD. Romanian descended from a variant of Vulgar Latin spoken in one or more Latin-speaking provinces.

Three major ethnic groups – the Dacians, Illyrians and Thracians – inhabited the northern regions of Southeastern Europe in Antiquity. Modern knowledge of their languages is based on limited evidence (primarily on proper names), making all scholarly theories proposing a strong relationship between the three languages or between Thracian and Dacian speculative.

The Illyrians were the first to be conquered by the Romans, who organized their territory into the province of Illyricum around 60 BC. In the lands inhabited by Thracians, the Romans set up the province of Moesia in 6 AD, and Thracia forty years later. The territory between the Lower Danube and the Black Sea (now Dobruja in Romania and Bulgaria) was attached to Moesia in 46.

The Romans annihilated the Dacian kingdom to the north of the Lower Danube under Emperor Trajan in 106. Its western territories were organized into the province of Dacia (or "Dacia Traiana"), but Maramureș and further regions inhabited by the Costoboci, Bastarnae and other tribes remained free of Roman rule. The Romans officially abandoned Dacia under Emperor Aurelian (r. 270–275). Along with the abandonment of Dacia, Aurelian organized a new province bearing the same name ("Dacia Aureliana") south of the Lower Danube. Roman forts were erected north of the river in the 320s, but the river became the boundary between the empire and the Goths in the 360s. Meanwhile, from 313 under the Edict of Milan, the Roman Empire began to transform itself into a Christian state. Roman emperors supported Christian missionaries in the north-Danubian territories which were dominated by the Goths from the 340s.

The Huns destroyed all these territories between 376 and 406, but their empire also collapsed in 453. Thereafter the Gepids exercised control over Banat, Crișana, and Transylvania. The Bulgars, Antes, Sclavenes and other tribes made frequent raids across the Lower Danube against the Balkans in the 6th century. The Roman Empire revived under Emperor Justinian I (r. 527–565), but the Avars, who had subjugated the Gepids, invaded the Balkans from the 580s. In 30 years all Roman troops were withdrawn from the peninsula, where only Dyrrhachium, Thessaloniki and a few other towns remained under Roman rule.

The next arrivals, the Bulgars, established their own state on the Lower Danube in 681. Their territorial expansion accelerated after the collapse of the Avar Khaganate in the 790s. The ruler of the First Bulgarian Empire, Boris I (r. 852–889) converted to Christianity in 864. A synod of the Bulgarian Orthodox Church promoted a liturgy in Old Church Slavonic in 893.

Bulgaria was invaded by the Magyars (or Hungarians) in 894, but a joint counter-attack by the Bulgars and the Pechenegs – a nomadic Turkic people – forced the Magyars to find a new homeland in the Carpathian Basin. Historians still debate whether they encountered a Romanian population in the territory. The Byzantines occupied the greater part of Bulgaria under Emperor John I Tzimiskes (r. 969–976). The Bulgars regained their independence during the reign of Samuel (r. 997–1014), but Emperor Basil II of Byzantium conquered their country around 1018.

The Hungarians' supreme ruler, Stephen, was baptized according to the Western rite. He expanded his rule over new territories, including Banat. Pecheneg groups, pushed by the Ouzes – a coalition of Turkic nomads – sought asylum in the Byzantine Empire in the 1040s. After the Ouzes there followed the Cumans – also a Turkic confederation – who took control of the Pontic steppes in the 1070s. Thereafter, specific groups, including the Hungarian-speaking Székelys and the Pechenegs, defended the frontiers of the Kingdom of Hungary against them. The arrival of mostly German-speaking colonists in the 1150s also reinforced the Hungarian monarch's rule in the region.

The Byzantine authorities introduced new taxes, provoking an uprising in the Balkan Mountains in 1185. The local Bulgarians and Vlachs achieved their independence and established the Second Bulgarian Empire in coalition with the Cumans. A chieftain of the western Cuman tribes accepted Hungarian supremacy in 1227. The Hungarian expansion towards the Pontic steppes was halted by the large Mongol campaign against Eastern and Central Europe in 1241. Although the Mongols withdrew in a year, their invasion caused destruction throughout the region.

The unification of small polities ruled by local Romanian leaders in Oltenia and Muntenia led to the establishment of a new principality, Wallachia. It achieved independence under Basarab the Founder, who defeated a Hungarian army in the battle of Posada in 1330. A second principality, Moldavia, became independent in the 1360s under Bogdan I, a Romanian nobleman from the Voivodeship of Maramureș.

== Theories on the Romanians' ethnogenesis ==
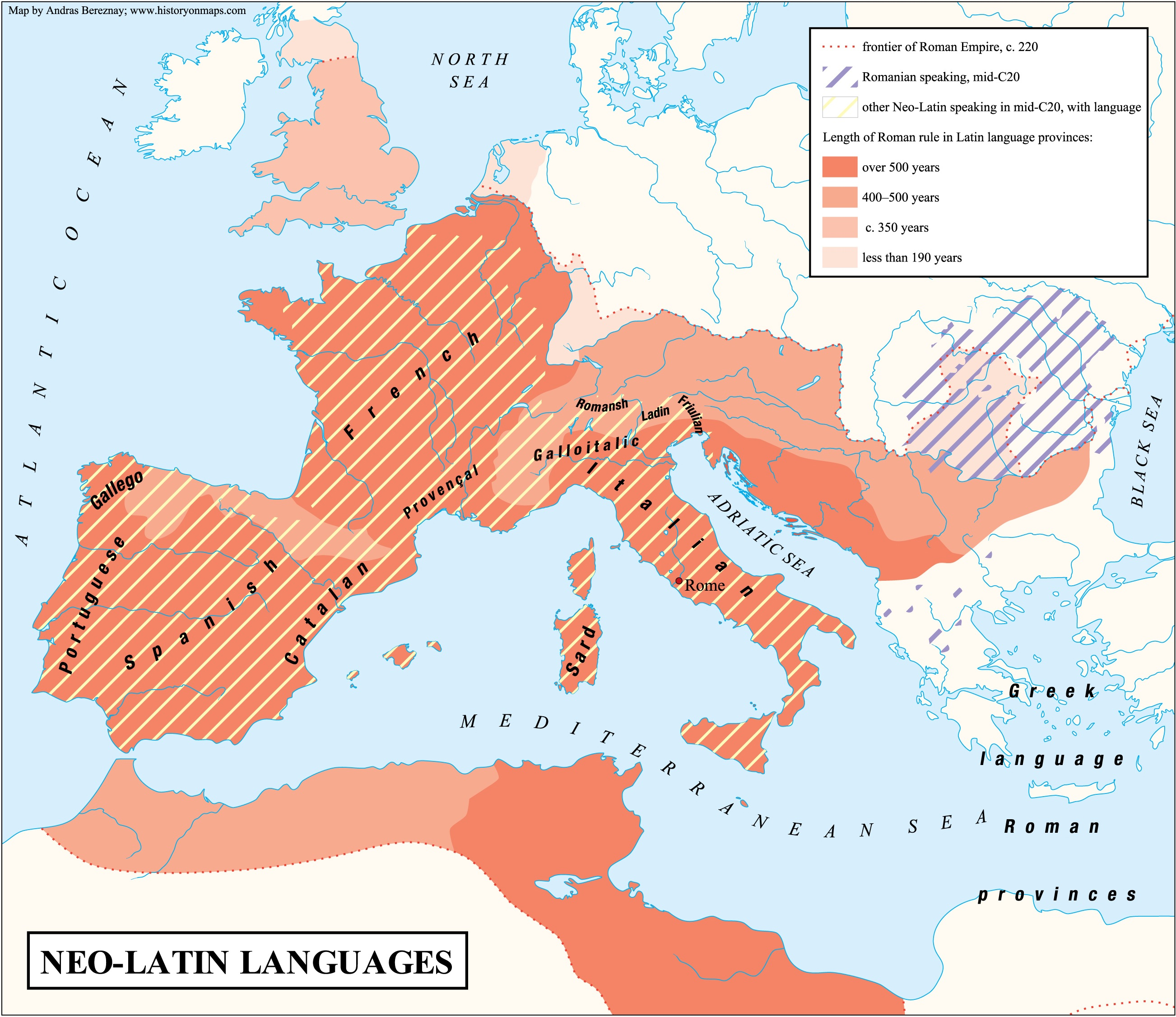
Length of Roman rule and distribution of modern Romance languages. Romanian is the only Romance language which is spoken primarily in territories which were never or only for about 170 years under Roman rule.

Romanians, known by the exonym Vlachs in the Middle Ages, speak a language descended from the Vulgar Latin that was once spoken in south-eastern Europe. Inscriptions from the Roman period show that a line, known as the "Jireček Line", can be drawn through the Balkan Peninsula, which separated the Latin-speaking northern provinces, including Dacia, Moesia and Pannonia from the southern regions where Greek remained the predominant language. Eastern Romance now has four variants, which are former dialects of a Proto-Romanian language. Daco-Romanian, the official language of Romania, is the most widespread of the four variants. Speakers of the Aromanian language live in scattered communities in Albania, Bulgaria, Greece and North Macedonia. Another two, by now nearly extinct variants, Megleno-Romanian and Istro-Romanian, are spoken in some villages in North Macedonia and Greece, and in Croatia, respectively. Aromanian and Megleno-Romanian are spoken in the central and southern regions of the Balkans (to the south of the Jireček Line), indicating that they migrated to these territories in the Middle Ages.

Among the first to note the Latin character of the language were Italian humanists Poggio Bracciolini and Flavio Biondo. One of the first scholars who systematically studied the Romance languages, Friedrich Christian Diez (1797–1876), described Romanian as a semi-Romance language in the 1830s. In his Grammar of the Romance Languages (1836) Diez highlights six languages of the Romance area which attract attention, in terms of their grammatical or literary significance: Italian and Romanian, Spanish and Portuguese, Provençal and French. All six languages have their first and common source in Latin, a language which is 'still intertwined with our civilization'. Harald Haarmann considers that any discussion about the position of Romanian within the Romance philology was definitely decided with the Grammar of Diez. After the publication of his Grammar of the Romance Languages, Romanian is always listed among the Romance languages. In 2009, Kim Schulte likewise argued that "Romanian is a language with a hybrid vocabulary". The proportion of loanwords in Romanian is indeed higher than in other Romance languages. Its certain structural features—such as the construction of the future tense—also distinguish Romanian from other Romance languages. Some peculiarities connect it to Albanian, Bulgarian and other tongues spoken in the Balkan Peninsula. Nevertheless, as linguist Graham Mallinson emphasizes, Romanian "retains enough of its Latin heritage at all linguistic levels to qualify for membership of the Romance family in its own right", even without taking into account the "re-Romancing tendency" during its recent history.

The territories south of the Danube were subject to the Romanization process for about 800 years, while Dacia province to the north of the river was only for 165 years under Roman rule, which caused "a certain disaccord between the effective process of Roman expansion and Romanization and the present ethnic configuration of Southeastern Europe", according to Lucian Boia. Political and ideological considerations, including the dispute between Hungary and Romania over Transylvania, have also colored these scholarly discussions.

Accordingly, theories on the Romanian Urheimat or "homeland" can be divided into two or more groups, including the theory of Daco-Roman continuity of the continuous presence of the Romanians' ancestors in the lands north of the Lower Danube and the opposite immigrationist theory. Independently of the theories, a number of scholars propose that Romanian developed from the tongue of a bilingual population, because bilingualism is the most probable explanation for its peculiarities.

Romanian (and other, closely related, 'Daco-Romanian' varieties), Aromanian (also called 'Macedo-Romanian'), Istro-Romanian, and Megleno-Romanian jointly constitute the four subdivisions of the 'Daco-Romance' branch of the Romance languages. Although they share a common ancestor, their early history (including the location and extent of the territory where 'Daco-Romance' originated; cf. Andreose and Renzi 2013:287), and the historical links between them, remain obscure. Aromanian and Romanian probably became separate before the eleventh century, Istro-Romanian and Romanian not before the thirteenth; the affiliation of Megleno-Romanian is debated.

— Martin Maiden

=== Historiography: origin of the theories ===
Byzantine authors were the first to write of the Romanians (or Vlachs). The 11th-century scholar Kekaumenos wrote of a Vlach homeland situated "near the Danube and [...] the Sava, where the Serbians lived more recently". He associates the Vlachs with the Dacians and the Bessi. Accordingly, historians have located this homeland in several places, including Pannonia Inferior and Dacia Aureliana. When associating the Vlachs with ancient ethnic groups, Kekaumenos followed the practice of Byzantine authors who named contemporary peoples for peoples known from ancient sources. The 12th-century scholar John Kinnamos wrote that the Vlachs "are said to be formerly colonists from the people of Italy". William of Rubruck wrote that the Vlachs of Bulgaria descended from the Ulac people, who lived beyond Bashkiria. According to Victor Spinei, Rubruck's words imply that he regarded the Vlachs a migrant population, coming from the region of the Volga like their Hungarian and Bulgarian neighbors. The late 13th-century Hungarian chronicler Simon of Kéza states that the Vlachs (Blackis) were "shepherds and husbandmen of the Huns" who "remained in Pannonia". An unknown author's Description of Eastern Europe from 1308 likewise states that the Balkan Vlachs "were once the shepherds of the Romans" who fled Hungary and "had over them ten powerful kings in the entire Messia and Pannonia".

According to the Dutch linguist Willem Vermeer, it can be excluded that Romanian arose north of the danube, at the same time it can be excluded that Romanian arose in the Southern Balkans in present day Greece. For historical and linguistic reasons, Romanian originated in what is today South-Serbia, Kosovo and North Macedonia, having been in contact with Albanian. The migration of Serbo-Croat speakers into the area led to the spread of the Romanian language to other areas.

Poggio Bracciolini, an Italian scholar was the first to write (around 1450) that the Romanians' ancestors had been Roman colonists settled in Dacia Traiana. In 1458, Aeneas Sylvius Piccolomini stated in his work De Europa (1458) that the Vlachs were a genus Italicum ("an Italian race") and were named after one Pomponius Flaccus, a commander sent against the Dacians. Piccolomini's version of the Vlachs' origin from Roman settlers in Dacia Traiana was repeated by many scholars—including the Italian Flavio Biondo and Pietro Ranzano, the Transylvanian Saxon Johannes Lebelius and the Hungarian István Szántó — in the subsequent century. Laonikos Chalkokondyles—a late-15th-century Byzantine scholar—stated that he never heard anyone "explain clearly where" the Romanians "came from to inhabit" their lands. Chalkokondyles wrote: "the race that inhabits Dacia and the mount Pindus also spread into Thessaly: both groups are called Vlachs, but I cannot tell which group migrated to the region of the other" claiming also that it is said they have come "from many places and settled that area". This means Chalkokondyles knew that the Balkan Romanians were of common origin. He also says that the Dacians' language is "similar to Italian but very altered" and that their country "stretches from Ardelion, in the Paionian Dacia, to the Black Sea". The 17th-century Johannes Lucius expressed his concerns about the survival of Romans in the territory of the former Dacia Traiana province, exposed to invasions for a millennium.

A legend on the origin of the Moldavians, preserved in the Moldo-Russian Chronicle from around 1505, narrates that one "King Vladislav of Hungary" invited their Romanian ancestors to his kingdom and settled them "in Maramureș between the Moreș and Tisa at a place called Crij". Logofăt Istratie and other 17th-century Moldavian historians continued to credit "King Vladislav" with the settlement of the Romanians' ancestors in Maramureș. Grigore Ureche's Chronicle of Moldavia of 1647 is the first Romanian historical work stating that the Romanians "all come from Rîm" (Rome). In 30 years Miron Costin explicitly connected the Romanians' ethnogenesis to the conquest of "Dacia Traiana". The oldest Muntenian chronicle, the Letopisețul Cantacuzinesc, preserving significant popular tradition among Wallachians, wrote "But first the Romanians splitting up from the Romans wandered to the north, their chief being Trajan and his son Siverie, crossing the waters of the Danube, some settled at Turnu Severin; others, along the waters of the Olt, the Mureș and the Tisza; and still others in Hungary, reaching as far as Maramureș. Those who settled at Turnu Severin, extended along the foot of the mountains to the waters of the Olt, and others wandered downward along the Danube, and thus all places having been filled with them". According to Grecescu, Simonescu and Djuvara, the author of the Letopisețul Cantacuzinesc is describing the conquest of Dacia by Trajan, which started with the crossing of the Danube in the area of Turnu Severin, arriving up to Maramureș. Constantin Cantacuzino stated in 1716 that the native Dacians also had a role in the formation of the Romanian people. Petru Maior and other historians of the "Transylvanian School" flatly denied any interbreeding between the natives and the conquerors, claiming that the autochthonous Dacian population which was not eradicated by the Romans fled the territory. The Daco-Roman mixing became widely accepted in the Romanian historiography around 1800. This view is advocated by the Greek-origin historians Dimitrie Philippide in his work History of Romania (1816) and Dionisie Fotino, who wrote History of Dacia (1818). The idea was accepted and taught in the Habsburg monarchy, including Hungary until the 1870s, although the Austrian Franz Joseph Sulzer had by the 1780s rejected any form of continuity north of the Danube, and instead proposed a 13th-century migration from the Balkans.

The development of the theories was closely connected to political debates in the 18th century. Important historians of this time (Note: Like Joseph Sulzer, Joseph Karl Eder, Johann Christian Engel, Michael Balmann, Carol Shuller or Martin Bolla.) theorized Romanian migration from the Balkans. Sulzer's theory was apparently connected to his plans on the annexation of Wallachia and Moldavia by the Habsburg Monarchy, and the settlement of German colonists in both principalities. The three political "nations" of the Principality of Transylvania, actually meaning: its Estates (Hungarian nobility, and the leading classes of the free Saxons and Székelys, which excluded serfs of all these ethnicities) enjoyed special privileges, while local legislation emphasized that the Romanians had been "admitted into the country for the public good" and they were only "tolerated for the benefit of the country". When suggesting that the Romanians of Transylvania were the direct descendants of the Roman colonists in Emperor Trajan's Dacia, the historians of the "Transylvanian School" also demanded that the Romanians were to be regarded as the oldest residents of the country. The Supplex Libellus Valachorum – a petition completed by the representatives of the local Romanians in 1791 – explicitly demanded that the Romanians should be granted the same legal status that the three privileged "nations" had enjoyed because the Romanians were of Roman stock.

The concept of the common origin of the Romanians of the Habsburg Empire, Moldavia and Wallachia inevitably gave rise to the development of the idea of a united Romanian state. A series of "Dacian" projects about the unification of all lands inhabited by Romanians emerged in the 19th century. Moise Nicoară was the first to claim that the Romanian nation extends "from the Tisza to the Black Sea, from the Danube to the Dniester" in 1815. After irredentism became an important element of political debates among Romanian nationalists in the 1890s, the continuity theory "added a considerable element of historical prestige to Romanian claims to Transylvania". After World War I, the peace treaties confirmed Romania's new borders, acknowledging the incorporation of Transylvania, Bukovina and some neighboring regions in Greater Romania. Debates about the venue of the formation of the Romanian people became especially passionate after Hitler enforced the restoration of northern Transylvania to Hungary in 1940. Hungarian scholars published a series of detailed studies to disprove the continuity theory, and the Romanians did not fail to take issue with them.

After some oscillations in the 1950s, the strictest variant of the continuity theory became dominant in Communist Romania. Official historians claimed that the formation of the Romanian people started in the lands within the actual Romanian borders, stating that the south-Danubian territories had only had a role during the preceding "Romanic" phase of the Romanians' ethnogenesis. Nicolae Ceaușescu made history one of the "pillars of national Communism" in the 1970s. To meet his expectations, historians started to diminish the role of Slavs, and even of Romans, emphasizing the authochthonous character of Romanian culture and society. On the other hand, the Hungarian Academy of Sciences published a three-volume monography about the history of Transylvania in 1986, presenting the arguments of the immigrationist theory. The Hungarian government had supported its publication and the Minister of Education, the linguist and historian, Béla Köpeczi, was the general editor of the volumes. The historian Keith Hitchins notes that the controversy "has lasted down to the post-Communist era", but it "has assumed an attenuated form as membership in the European Union has softened territorial rivalries between Romania and Hungary". According to Vlad Georgescu, Bulgarian historians tend to support the continuity theory, but also to diminish the Vlachs' role in the history of the Balkans, while most Russian historians accept the continuous presence of the Romanians' ancestors in Transylvania and Banat, but deny any form of continuity in Moldova. Linguist Gottfried Schramm emphasizes that the Romanians' ethnogenesis is a "fundamental problem of the history and linguistic history of Southeastern Europe" and urges scholars from third countries to start studying it.

=== Theory of Daco-Roman continuity ===
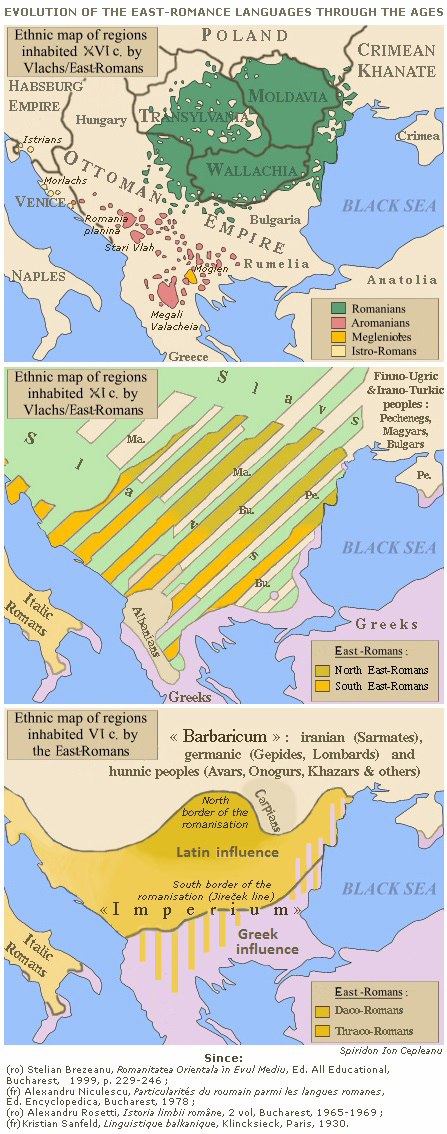
The evolution of the Eastern Romance languages and territories between 6th–16th centuries according to those who accept the continuity theory

Scholars supporting the continuity theory argue that the Romanians descended primarily from the Daco-Romans, a people developing through the cohabitation of the native Dacians and the Roman colonists in the province of Dacia Traiana (primarily in present-day Romania) north of the river Danube. The province encompassed three regions of present-day Romania (Oltenia, Banat, and Transylvania) to the north of the Lower Danube from 106.

In these scholars' view, the close contacts between the autochthonous Dacians and the Roman colonists led to the formation of the Romanian people because masses of provincials stayed behind after the Roman Empire abandoned the province in the early 270s. Thereafter the process of Romanization expanded to the neighboring regions due to the free movement of people across the former imperial borders. The spread of Christianity contributed to the process, since Latin was the language of liturgy among the Daco-Romans. The Romans held bridgeheads north of the Lower Danube, keeping Dacia within their sphere of influence uninterruptedly until 376.

Proponents of the theory argues that the north-Danubian regions remained the main "center of Romanization" after the Slavs started assimilating the Latin-speaking population in the lands south of the Danube, or forcing them to move even further south in the 7th century. The natural barriers of the Carpathian Mountains allowed the Daco-Romans to preserve their cultural and linguistic identity while other peoples in the region were assimilated by various migratory tribes. Although for a millennium migratory peoples invaded the territory, a sedentary Christian Romance-speaking population survived, primarily in the densely forested areas, separated from the "heretic" or pagan invaders. Only the "semisedentarian" Slavs exerted some influence on the Romanians' ancestors, especially after they adopted Orthodox Christianity in the 9th century. They played the role in the Romanians' ethnogenesis that the Germanic peoples had played in the formation of other Romance peoples.

Historians who accept the continuity theory emphasize that the Romanians "form the numerically largest people" in southeastern Europe. Romanian ethnographers point at the "striking similarities" between the traditional Romanian folk dress and the Dacian dress depicted on Trajan's Column as clear evidence for the connection between the ancient Dacians and modern Romanians. They also highlight the importance of the massive and organized colonization of Dacia Traiana. One of them, Coriolan H. Opreanu underlines that "nowhere else has anyone defied reason by stating that a [Romance] people, twice as numerous as any of its neighbours..., is only accidentally inhabiting the territory of a former Roman province, once home to a numerous and strongly Romanized population".

With the colonists coming from many provinces and living side by side with the natives, Latin must have emerged as their common language. The Dacians willingly adopted the conquerors' "superior" culture and they spoke Latin as their native tongue after two or three generations. Estimating the provincials' number at 500,000-1,000,000 in the 270s, supporters of the continuity theory rule out the possibility that masses of Latin-speaking commoners abandoned the province when the Roman troops and officials left it, as according to them the complete relocation of a population of that size was not logistically possible. After the abandonment of Dacia by the Roman army and administration and the frequent invasions of barbarians, the Daco-Roman population moved from the plains and river valleys to mountainous and hilly areas with better natural defenses. In this regard, on the first plan in the economy was put forward animal husbandry with the existence of agriculture and some crafts, and the settlements became small and relatively short-lived. Historian Ioan-Aurel Pop concludes that the relocation of hundreds of thousands of people across the Lower Danube in a short period was impossible, especially because the commoners were unwilling to "move to foreign places, where they had nothing of their own and where the lands were already occupied." Historians who accept the continuity theory also argue that Roman sources do not mention that the Roman population was moved from Dacia Traiana, but that the military and administration were removed.

Most Romanian scholars accepting the continuity theory regard the archaeological evidence for the uninterrupted presence of a Romanized population in the lands now forming Romania undeniable. Especially, artefacts bearing Christian symbolism, hoards of bronze Roman coins and Roman-style pottery are listed among the archaeological finds verifying the theory. The same scholars emphasize that the Romanians directly inherited the basic Christian terminology from Latin, which also substantiates the connection between Christian objects and the Romanians' ancestors. Other scholars who support the same theory underline that the connection between certain artefacts or archaeological assemblages and ethnic groups is uncertain. Instead of archaeological evidence, Alexandru Madgearu highlights the importance of the linguistic traces of continuity, referring to the Romanian river names in the Apuseni Mountains and the preservation of archaic Latin lexical elements in the local dialect. The survival of the names of the largest rivers from Antiquity is often cited as an evidence for the continuity theory, although some linguists who support it note that a Slavic-speaking population transmitted them to modern Romanians. Some words directly inherited from Latin are also said to prove the continuous presence of the Romanians' ancestors north of the Danube, because they refer to things closely connected to these regions, as well as the preservation of Romanian words of Latin origin that the other Romance languages have lost. Linguists Grigore Nandriș and Marius Sala argue that the Latin words for natural oil, gold and bison could only be preserved in the lands to the north of the river.

Written sources did not mention the Romanians, either those who lived north of the Lower Danube or those living to the south of the river, for centuries. Scholars supporting the continuity theory note that the silence of sources does not contradict it, because early medieval authors named the foreign lands and their inhabitants after the ruling peoples. Hence, they mentioned Gothia, Hunia, Gepidia, Avaria, Patzinakia and Cumania, and wrote of Goths, Huns, Gepids, Avars, Pechenegs and Cumans, without revealing the multi-ethnic character of these realms. References to the Volokhi in the Russian Primary Chronicle, and to the Blakumen in Scandinavian sources are often listed as the first records of north-Danubian Romanians. The Gesta Hungarorum—the oldest extant Hungarian gesta, or book of deeds, written around 1200, some 300 years after the described events— mentions the Vlachs and the "shepherd of the Romans" (et Blachij, ac pastores romanorum) along with the Bulgarians, Slavs, Greeks, Khazars, Székelys, and other people among the inhabitants of the Carpathian Basin at the time of the arrival of the Hungarians in the late 9th century. Simon of Kéza's later Hungarian chronicle described the Vlachs (Blackis) as "shepherds and husbandmen of the Huns" who remained in Pannonia. The historian Ioan-Aurel Pop concludes that the two chronicles "assert the Roman origin of Romanians... by presenting them as the Romans' descendants" who stayed in the former Roman provinces.

=== Immigrationist theory ===
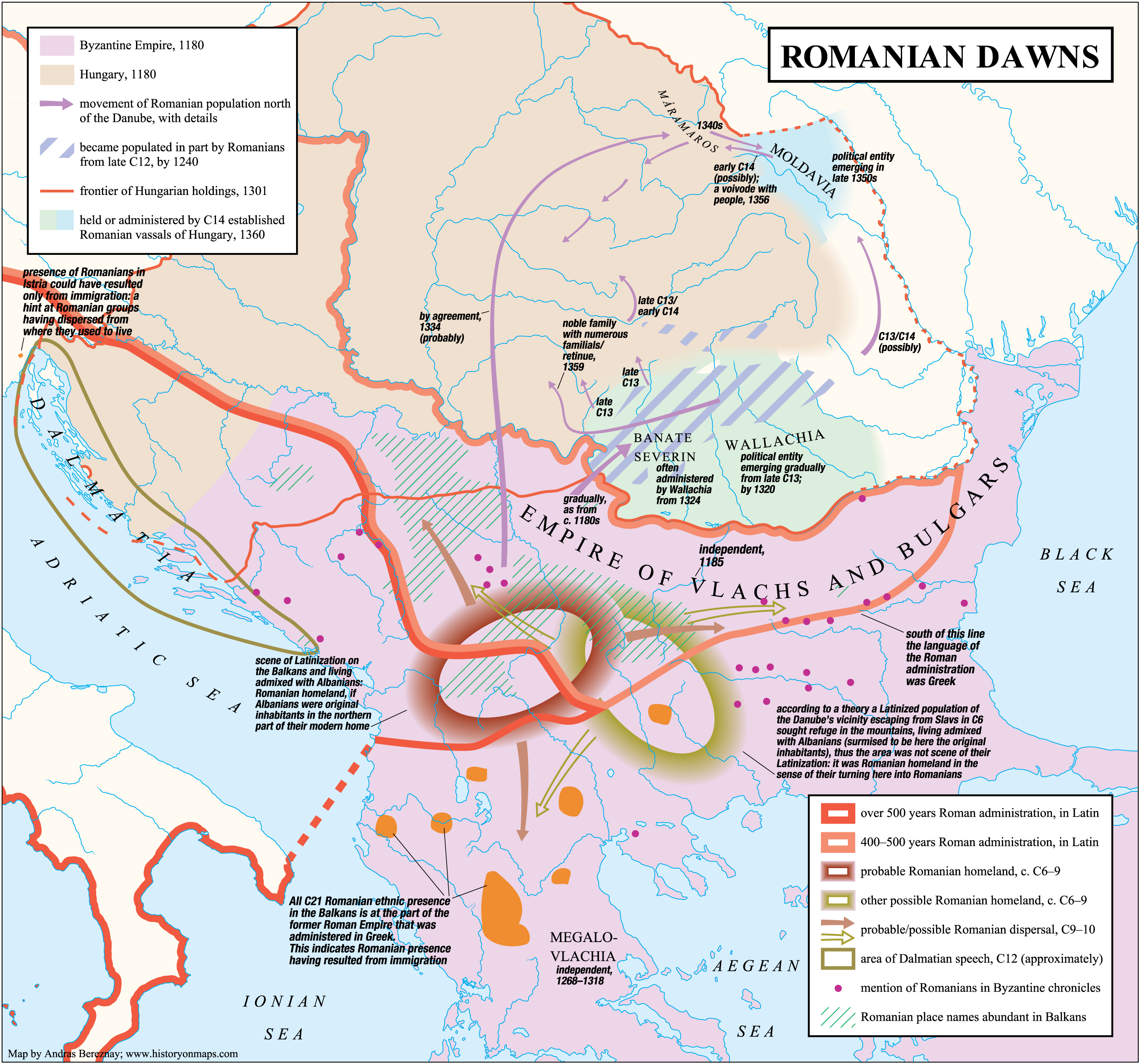
The Romanians' homeland and their medieval migrations (a map presenting views proposed by scholars who accept the "immigrationist theory")

Scholars who support the immigrationist theory propose that the Romanians descended from the Romanized inhabitants of the provinces to the south of the Danube. Following the collapse of the empire's frontiers around 620, some of this population moved south to regions where Latin had not been widely spoken. During the Slavic migrations to the Balkans, many took refuge in the Balkan Mountains where they adopted an itinerant form of sheep- and goat-breeding, giving rise to the modern Vlach shepherds. They intermingled with Albanians. Their mobile lifestyle contributed to their spread in the mountainous zones. The start of their northward migration cannot exactly be dated, but they did not settle in the lands north to the Lower Danube before the end of the 10th century, and they crossed the Carpathians after the mid-12th century.

Immigrationist scholars emphasize that all other Romance languages developed in regions which had been under Roman rule for more than 500 years and nothing suggests that Romanian was an exception. Even in Britain, where the Roman rule lasted for 365 years (more than twice as long as in Dacia Traiana), the pre-Roman languages survived. Proponents of the theory have not developed a consensual view about the Dacians' fate after the Roman conquest, but they agree that the presence of a non-Romanized rural population (either the remnants of the local Dacians, or immigrant tribesmen) in Dacia Traiana is well-documented. The same scholars find it hard to believe that the Romanized elements preferred to stay behind when the Roman authorities announced the withdrawal of the troops from the province and offered the civilians the opportunity to follow them to the Balkans. Furthermore, the Romans had started fleeing from Dacia Traiana decades before it was abandoned.

Almost no place name had been preserved in the former province (while more than twenty settlements still bear a name of Roman origin in England). The present forms of the few river names inherited from antiquity show that non-Latin-speaking populations—Dacians and Slavs—mediated them to the modern inhabitants of the region. Both literary sources and archaeological finds confirm this conjecture: the presence of Carpians, Vandals, Taifals, Goths, Gepids, Huns, Slavs, Avars, Bulgarians and Hungarians in the former Roman province in the early Middle Ages is well documented. Sporadic references to few Latin-speaking individuals—merchants and prisoners of war—among the Huns and Gepids in the 5th century do not contradict this picture. Since Eastern Germanic peoples inhabited the lands to the north of the Lower Danube for more than 300 years, the lack of loanwords borrowed from them also indicates that the Romanians' homeland was located in other regions. Likewise, no early borrowings from Eastern or Western Slavic languages can be proven, although the Romanians' ancestors should have had much contact with Eastern and Western Slavs to the north of the Danube.

Immigrationist scholars underline that the population of the Roman provinces to the south of the Danube was "thoroughly Latinized". Romanian has common features with idioms spoken in the Balkans (especially with Albanian and Bulgarian), suggesting that these languages developed side by side for centuries. South Slavic loanwords also abound in Romanian. Literary sources attest the presence of significant Romance-speaking groups in the Balkans (especially in the mountainous regions) in the Middle Ages. Dozens of place names of Romanian origin can still be detected in the same territory. The Romanians became Orthodox Christians and adopted Old Church Slavonic as liturgical language, which could hardly have happened in the lands to the north of the Danube after 864 (when Boris I of Bulgaria converted to Christianity). Early medieval documents unanimously describe the Vlachs as a mobile pastoralist population. Slavic and Hungarian loanwords also indicate that the Romanians' ancestors adopted a settled way of life only at a later phase of their ethnogenesis.

Reliable sources refer to the Romanians' presence in the lands to the north of the Danube for the first time in the 1160s. No place names of Romanian origin were recorded where early medieval settlements existed in this area. Here, the Romanians adopted Hungarian, Slavic and German toponyms, also indicating that they arrived after the Saxons settled in southern Transylvania in the mid-12th century. The Romanians initially formed scattered communities in the Southern Carpathians, but their northward expansion is well-documented from the second half of the 13th century. Both the monarchs and individual landowners (including Roman Catholic prelates) promoted their immigration because the Romanian sheep-herders strengthened the defense of the borderlands, and settled areas which could not be brought into agricultural cultivation. The Romanians adopted a sedentary way of life after they started settling on the edge of lowland villages in the mid-14th century. Their immigration continued during the following centuries and they gradually took possession of the settlements in the plains which had been depopulated by frequent incursions.

=== Admigration theory ===
According to the "admigration" theory, proposed by Dimitrie Onciul (1856–1923), the formation of the Romanian people occurred in the former "Dacia Traiana" province, and in the central regions of the Balkan Peninsula. However, the Balkan Vlachs' northward migration ensured that these centers remained in close contact for centuries. It is a compromise between the immigrationist and the continuity theories.

[Centuries] after the fall of the Balkan provinces, a pastoral Latin-Roman tradition served as the point of departure for a Valachian-Roman ethnogenesis. This kind of virtuality – ethnicity as hidden potential that comes to the fore under certain historical circumstances – is indicative of our new understanding of ethnic processes. In this light, the passionate discussion for or against Roman-Romanian continuity has been misled by a conception of ethnicity that is far too inflexible

— Pohl, Walter (1998)

== Written sources ==
=== On peoples north of the Lower Danube ===
==== Antiquity ====
In the 5th century BC, Herodotus was the first author to write a detailed account of the natives of south-eastern Europe. In connection with a Persian campaign in 514 BC, he mentions the Getae, which he called "the most courageous and upright Thracian tribe". The Getae were Thracian tribes living on either side of the Lower Danube, in what is today northern Bulgaria and southern Romania. Strabo (64/63 BCE-24 CE) wrote that the language of the Dacians was "the same as that of the Getae".

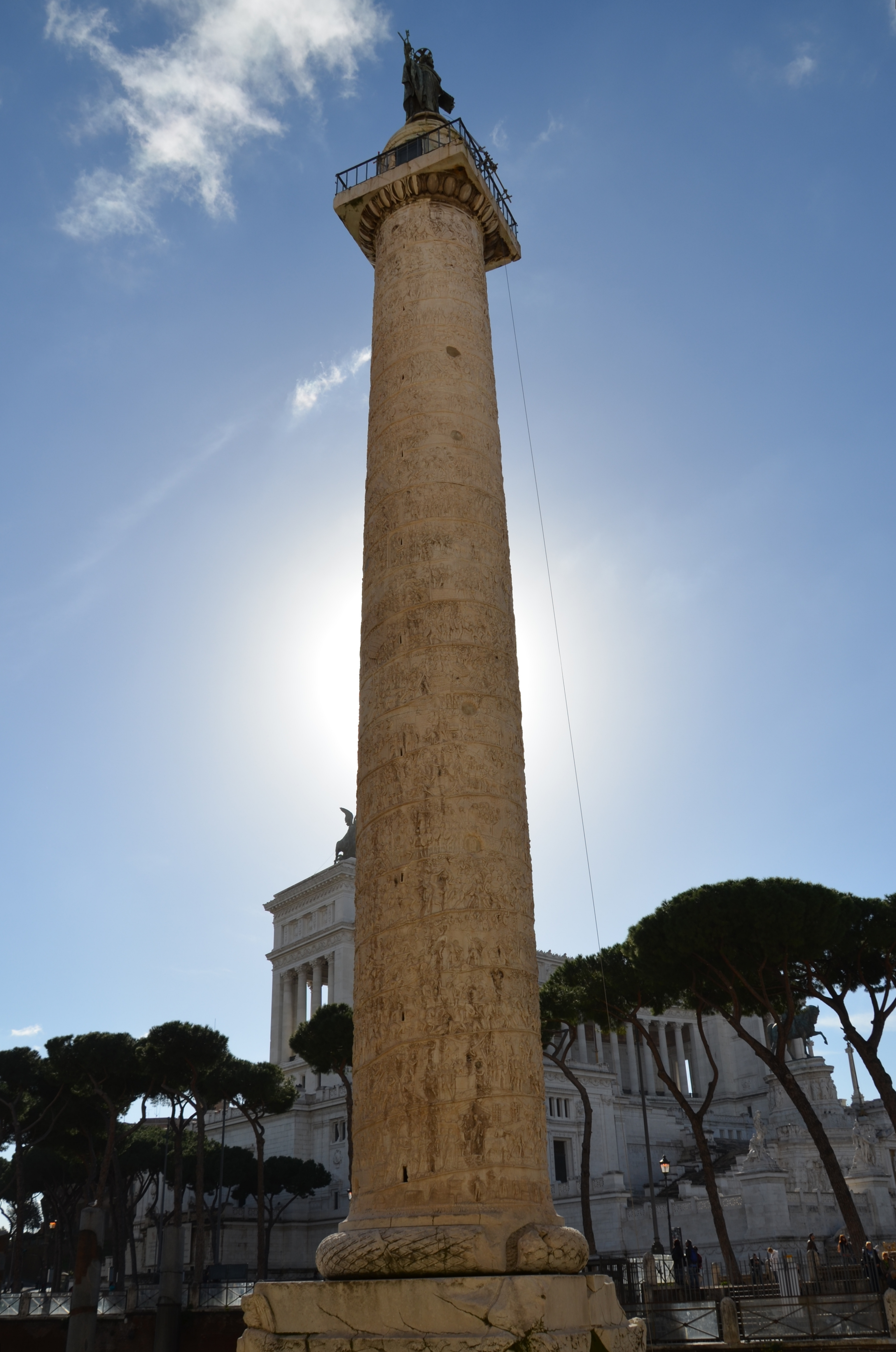
Trajan's Column in Rome

Literary tradition on the conquest of Dacia was preserved by 3-4 Roman scholars. Cassius Dio wrote that "numerous Dacians kept transferring their allegiance" to Emperor Trajan before he commenced his war against Decebalus . Lucian of Samosata (c. 125 – after 180 CE), Eutropius (fl. around 360 CE), and Julian the Apostate (331/332–363 CE) unanimously attest the memory of a "deliberate ethnic cleansing" that followed the fall of the Dacian state. For instance, Lucian of Samosata who cites Emperor Trajan's physician Criton of Heraclea states that the entire Dacian "people was reduced to forty men". In fact, Thracian or possibly Dacian names represent about 2% of the approximately 3,000 proper names known from "Dacia Traiana". Bitus, Dezibalos and other characteristic Dacian names were only recorded in the empire's other territories, including Egypt and Italy. Constantin Daicoviciu, Dumitru Protase, Dan Ruscu and other historians have debated the validity of the tradition of the Dacians' extermination. They state that it only refers to the men's fate or comes from Eutropius's writings to provide an acceptable explanation for the massive colonisation that followed the conquest. Indeed, Eutropius also reported that Emperor Trajan transferred to the new province "vast numbers of people from all over the Roman world". Onomastic evidence substantiates his words: about 2,000 Latin, 420 Greek, 120 Illyrian, and 70 Celtic names are known from the Roman period.

Barbarian attacks against "Dacia Traiana" were also recorded. For instance, "an inroad of the Carpi" forced Emperor Galerius's mother to flee from the province in the 240s. Aurelius Victor, Eutropius and Festus stated that Dacia "was lost" under Emperor Gallienus (r. 253–268). The Augustan History and Jordanes refer to the Roman withdrawal from the province in the early 270s. The Augustan History says that Emperor Aurelian "led away both soldiers and provincials" from Dacia in order to repopulate Illyricum and Moesia. Scholars supporting the immigrationist theory argue that for total assimilation at least 400 years of Roman rule would be needed, as in other provinces.

==== Early Middle Ages ====
In less than a century, the one-time province was named "Gothia", by authors including the 4th-century Orosius. The existence of Christian communities in Gothia is attested by the Passion of Sabbas, "a Goth by race" and by the martyrologies of Wereka and Batwin, and other Gothic Christians. Large number of Goths, Taifali, and according to Zosimus "other tribes that formerly dwelt among them" were admitted into the Eastern Roman Empire following the invasion of the Huns in 376. In contrast with these peoples, the Carpo-Dacians "were mixed with the Huns". Priscus of Panium, who visited the Hunnic Empire in 448, wrote that the empire's inhabitants spoke either Hunnic or Gothic, and that those who had "commercial dealings with the western Romans" also spoke Latin. He also mentions the local name of two drinks, medos and kam. Emperor Diocletian's Edict on Prices states that the Pannonians had a drink named kamos. Medos may have also been an Illyrian term, but a Germanic explanation cannot be excluded.

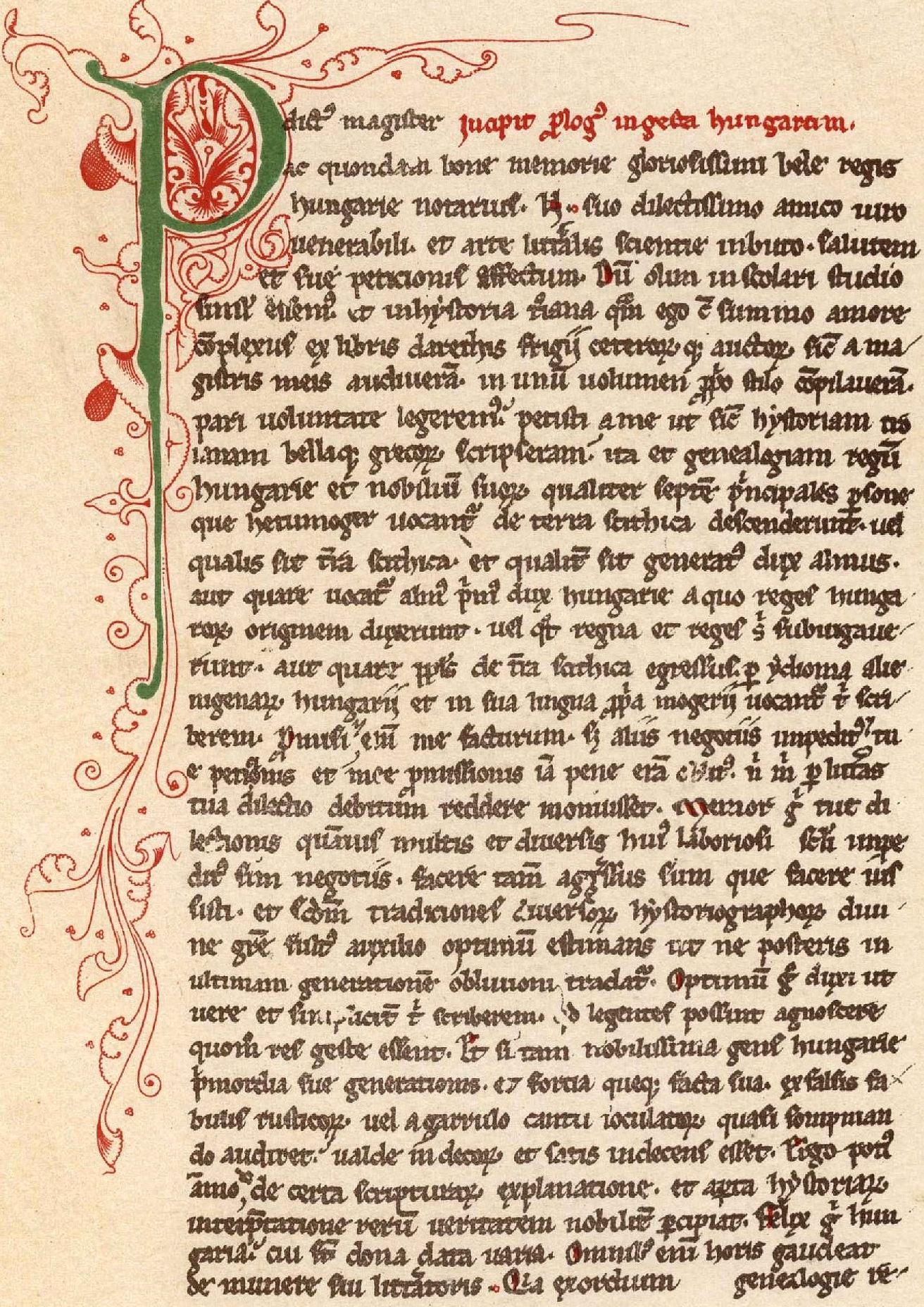
First page of the Gesta Hungarorum

The 6th-century author Jordanes who called Dacia "Gepidia" was the first to write of the Antes and Slavenes. He wrote that the Slavenes occupied the region "from the city of Noviodunum and the lake called Mursianus" to the river Dniester, and that the Antes dwelled "in the curve of the sea of Pontus". Procopius wrote that the Antes and the Slaveni spoke "the same language, an utterly barbarous tongue". He also writes of an Antian who "spoke in the Latin tongue". The late 7th-century author Ananias of Shirak wrote in his geography that the Slavs inhabited the "large country of Dacia" and formed 25 tribes. In 2001, Florin Curta argues, that the Slaveni ethnonym may have only been used "as an umbrella term for various groups living north of the Danube frontier, which were neither 'Antes', nor 'Huns' or 'Avars' ".

The Ravenna Geographer wrote about a Dacia "populated by the [...] Avars", but written sources from the 9th and 10th centuries are scarce. The Royal Frankish Annals refers to the Abodrites living "in Dacia on the Danube as neighbors of the Bulgars" around 824. The Bavarian Geographer locates the Merehanii next to the Bulgars. By contrast, Alfred the Great wrote of "Dacians, who were formerly Goths", living to the south-east of the "Vistula country" in his abridged translation (ca. 890) of Paulus Orosius' much earlier work Historiae Adversus Paganos written around 417. Emperor Constantine VII's De Administrando Imperio contains the most detailed information on the history of the region in the first decades of the 10th century. It reveals that Patzinakia, the Pechenegs' land was bordered by Bulgaria on the Lower Danube around 950, and the Hungarians lived on the rivers Criș, Mureș, Timiș, Tisa and Toutis at the same time. That the Pechenegs' land was located next to Bulgaria is confirmed by the contemporary Abraham ben Jacob.

==== First references to Romanians ====
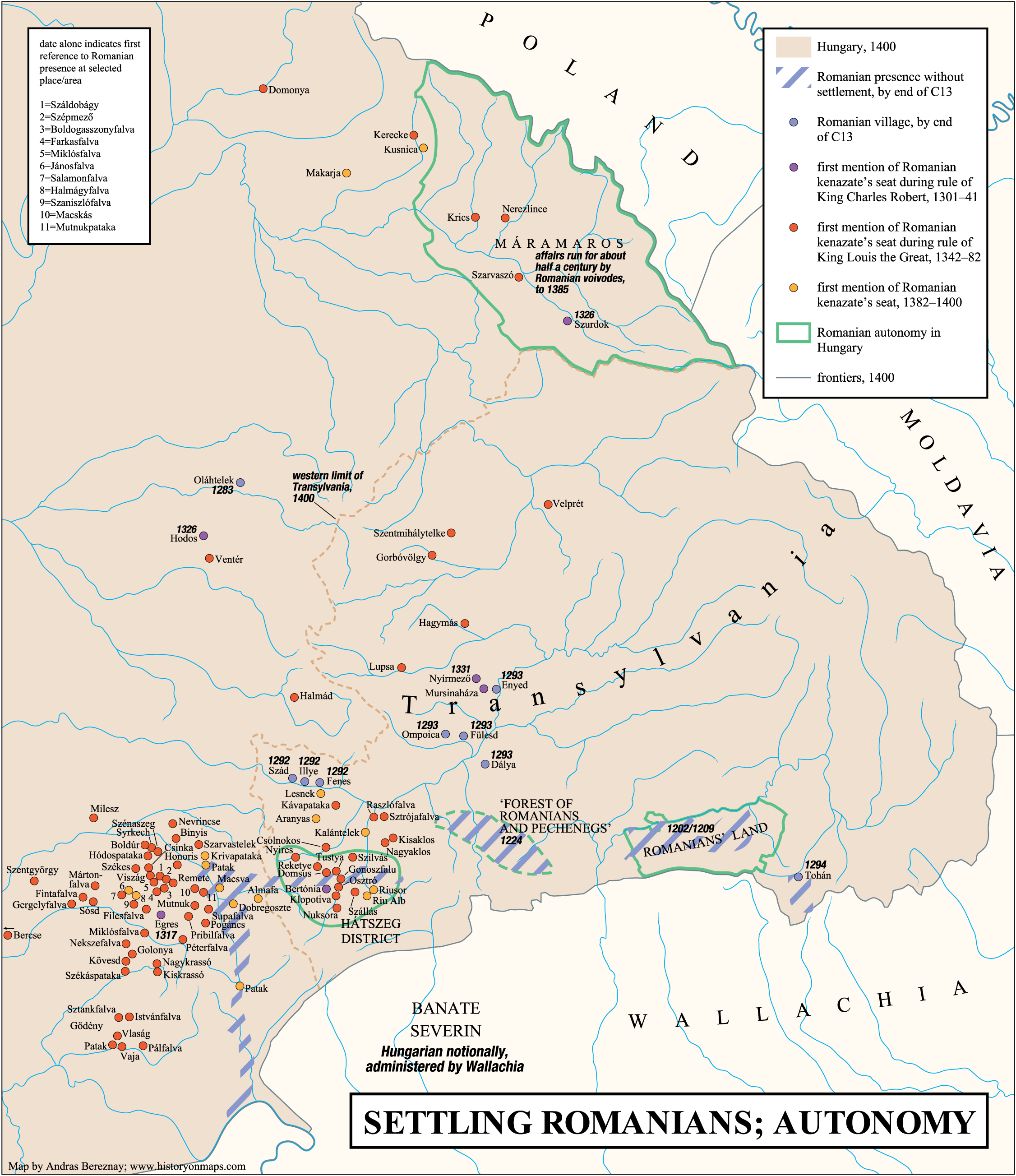
Earliest mentions of Romanian settlements in official documents in the Kingdom of Hungary (between 1200 and 1400).

The Gesta Hungarorum from around 1150 or 1200 is the first chronicle to write of Vlachs in the intra-Carpathian regions. Its anonymous author stated that the Hungarians encountered "Slavs, Bulgarians, Vlachs, and the shepherds of the Romans" when invading the Carpathian Basin around 895. He also wrote of Gelou, "a certain Vlach" ruling Transylvania, a land inhabited by "Vlachs and Slavs". In his study on medieval Hungarian chronicles, Carlile Aylmer Macartney concluded that the Gesta Hungarorum did not prove the presence of Romanians in the territory, since its author's "manner is much rather that of a romantic novelist than a historian". In contrast, Alexandru Madgearu, in his monography dedicated to the Gesta, stated that this chronicle "is generally credible", since its narration can be "confirmed by the archaeological evidence or by comparison with other written sources" in many cases.

It should also be noted that several of the local rulers presented by Anonymus as opponents of the conquering Hungarians, including Gelou, Menumorut, Salan and Glad, are not attested as such in contemporary or near-contemporary sources. Their historicity has therefore been questioned by historians. György Györffy argued that several of these figures were constructed by Anonymus from place names and later traditions; in the case of Gelou, he connected the ruler's name with the place name Gyalu. Györffy consequently regarded some of the political and military conflicts described by Anonymus as literary reconstructions rather than accounts independently supported by contemporary evidence.

The chronological distance between the Gesta Hungarorum and the events it describes also presents a significant source-critical problem. Anonymus wrote approximately three centuries after the Hungarian conquest. Gyula Kristó emphasized the importance of the circumstances and political conditions of Anonymus's own age in interpreting the Gesta, while Györffy likewise argued that Anonymus projected later political and ethnic conditions back into the conquest period. The chronicle therefore cannot by itself be treated as contemporary evidence for the ethnic and political composition of the Carpathian Basin around 895. Its references to Vlachs, Slavs, Bulgarians and local rulers must be evaluated alongside independent contemporary written sources, archaeological evidence, linguistics and toponymy rather than being accepted at face value as descriptions of the late ninth century.

The late 12th-century chronicle of Niketas Choniates contains another early reference to Vlachs living north of the Danube. He wrote that they seized the future Byzantine emperor, Andronikos Komnenos when "he reached the borders of Halych" in 1164. Thereafter, information on Vlachs from the territory of present-day Romania abounds. Choniates mentioned that the Cumans crossed the Lower Danube "with a division of Vlachs" from the north to launch a plundering raid against Thrace in 1199. Pope Gregory IX wrote about "a certain people in the Cumanian bishopric called Walati" and their bishops around 1234.

The oldest extant documents from Transylvania, dating from the 12th and 13th centuries, make passing references to both Hungarians and Vlachs. A royal charter of 1223 confirming a former grant of land is the earliest official document mentioning the presence of Romanians in Transylvania. It refers to the transfer of land previously held by them to the monastery of Cârța, which proves that this territory had been inhabited by Vlachs before the monastery was founded. According to the next document, the Teutonic Knights received the right to pass through the lands possessed by the Székelys and the Vlachs in 1223. Next year the Transylvanian Saxons were entitled to use certain forests together with the Vlachs and Pechenegs. A royal charter from 1250 states that Andrew I of Hungary sent Joachim, Count of Hermannstadt, to command an army composed of Saxon, Vlach, Székely, and Pecheneg warriors in support of Boril of Bulgaria after "three chieftains from Cumania" rebelled against him in the early 1210s. In the 1280s, Simon of Kéza in the Gesta Hunnorum et Hungarorum wrote that the Székelys are the remnants of Huns, meet with the returning Hungarians to join their conquest, then they acquired part of the country, but in the mountains, which they shared with the Vlachs, mingling with them and allegedly adopting the Vlachs' alphabet. This passage is repeated with small changes in the Chronicon Pictum. Kézai confused the Székelys runs with the Cyrillic script which was used by the Vlachs and his erroneous opinion is based maybe on the observation that the Vlach shepherds incised mnemonic signs while counting their sheep.

A charter of 1247 of King Béla IV of Hungary lists small Romanian polities existing north of the Lower Danube. Thomas Tuscus mentioned Vlachs fighting against the Ruthenes in 1276 or 1277. References to Vlachs living in the lands of secular lords and prelates in the Kingdom of Hungary appeared in the 1270s. First the canons of the cathedral chapter in Alba Iulia received a royal authorization to settle Romanians to their domains in 1276. Several sources report that during the Second Mongol invasion of Hungary of 1285, the Vlachs, along with the Székelys and Saxons, defended the Carpathian passes in Transylvania. Royal charters attest the presence of Romanians in more counties, for instance in Zaránd from 1318, in Bihar and in Máramaros from 1326, and in Torda from 1342. The first independent Romanian state, the Principality of Wallachia, was known as Oungrovlachia ("Vlachia near Hungary") in Byzantine sources, while Moldavia received the Greek denominations Maurovlachia ("Black Vlachia") or Russovlachia ("Vlachia near Russia").

Historian Ioan-Aurel Pop writes that hundreds of 15th-century Hungarian documents prove that the Romanians were thought to have held lands in Transylvania and the neighboring regions already early in the 11th century or even around 450. For instance, he lists documents mentioning liberties that "divi reges Hungariae" granted to the Romanians, proposing that the Latin text does not refer to the "deceased kings of Hungary" in general (which is its traditional translation), but specifically to the two 11th-century "holy kings of Hungary", Stephen I and Ladislaus I. Pop also refers to the testimony of a Romanian nobleman who stated in 1452 that his family had been in the possession of his estates for a thousand years in order to defend his property rights against another Romanian noble.

=== On Balkan Vlachs ===
The words torna, torna fratre recorded in connection with a Roman campaign across the Balkan Mountains by Theophylact Simocatta and Theophanes the Confessor evidence the development of a Romance language in the late 6th century. The words were shouted "in native parlance" by a local soldier in 587 or 588. When narrating the rebellion of Bulgar noble Kuber and his people against the Avars, the 7th-century Miracles of St. Demetrius mentions that a close supporter of his, Mauros spoke four languages, including "our language" (Greek) and "that of the Romans" (Latin). Kuber led a population of mixed origin – including the descendants of Roman provincials who had been captured in the Balkans in the early 7th century – from the region of Sirmium to Thessaloniki around 681.

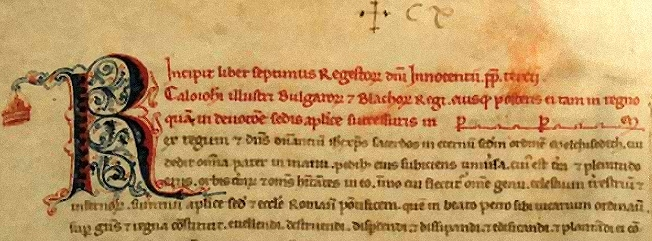
Letter of Kaloyan, "tsar of Bulgaria and Vlachia" to Pope Innocent III

John Skylitzes's chronicle contains one of the earliest records on the Balkan Vlachs. He mentions that "some vagabond Vlachs" killed David, one of the four Cometopuli brothers between Kastoria and Prespa in 976. After the Byzantine occupation of Bulgaria, Emperor Basil II set up the autocephalous Archbishopric of Ohrid with the right from 1020 to collect income "from the Vlachs in the whole of theme of Bulgaria". The late 11th-century Kekaumenos relates that the Vlachs of the region of Larissa had "the custom of having their herds and families stay in high mountains and other really cold places from the month of April to the month of September". A passing remark by Anna Comnena reveals that nomads of the Balkans were "commonly called Vlachs" around 1100. Occasionally, the Balkan Vlachs cooperated with the Cumans against the Byzantine Empire, for instance by showing them "the way through the passes" of the Stara Planina in the 1090s.

Most information on the 1185 uprising of the Bulgars and Vlachs and the subsequent establishment of the Second Bulgarian Empire is based on Niketas Choniates's chronicle. He states that it was "the rustling of their cattle" which provoked the Vlachs to rebel against the imperial government. Besides him, Ansbert, and a number of other contemporary sources refer to the Vlach origin of the Asen brothers who initiated the revolt. (Note: Ansbert referred to one of the Asen brothers, Peter II of Bulgaria as "Kalopetrus Flachus".) The Vlachs' pre-eminent role in the Second Bulgarian Empire is demonstrated by Blacia, and other similar denominations under which the new state was mentioned in contemporary sources. The Annales Florolivienses, the first such source, mentions the route of Emperor Frederick I Barbarossa "through Hungary, Russia, Cumania, Vlakhia, Durazzo, Byzantium and Turkey" during his crusade of 1189. Pope Innocent III used the terms "Vlachia and Bulgaria" jointly when referring to the whole territory of the Second Bulgarian Empire. Similarly, the chronicler Geoffrey of Villehardouin refers to the Bulgarian ruler Kaloyan as "Johanitsa, the king of Vlachia and Bulgaria". The Icelandic author Snorri Sturluson mentioned the Balkan Vlachs' territory as Blokumannaland in his early 13th-century text Heimskringla. William of Rubruck distinguished Bulgaria from Blakia. He stated that "Bulgaria, Blakia and Slavonia were provinces of the Greeks", implying that his Blakia was also located south of the Danube. Likewise, the "Vlach lands" mentioned in the works of Abulfeda, Ibn Khaldun and other medieval Muslim authors are identical with Bulgaria.

=== Uncertain references ===
The 10th-century Muslim scholars, Al-Muqaddasi and Ibn al-Nadim mentioned the Waladj and the Blaghā, respectively in their lists of peoples. The lists also refer to the Khazars, Alans, and Greeks, and it is possible that the two ethnonyms refer to Vlachs dwelling somewhere in south-eastern Europe. For instance, historian Alexandru Madgearu says that Al-Muqaddasi's work is the first reference to Romanians living north of the Danube. Victor Spinei writes that a runestone which was set up around 1050 contains the earliest reference to Romanians living east of the Carpathians. It refers to Blakumen who killed a Varangian merchant at an unspecified place. The 11th-century Persian writer, Gardizi, wrote about a Christian people "from the Roman Empire" called N.n.d.r, inhabiting the lands along the Danube. He describes them as "more numerous than the Hungarians, but weaker". Historian Adolf Armbruster identified this people as Vlachs. In Hungarian, the Bulgarians were called Nándor in the Middle Ages.

The Russian Primary Chronicle from 1113 contains possible references to Vlachs in the Carpathian Basin. It relates how the Volokhi seized "the territory of the Slavs" and were expelled by the Hungarians. Therefore, the Slavs' presence antedates the arrival of the Volokhi in the chronicle's narration. It places their country west to the Baltic sea. Madgearu and many other historians argue that the Volokhi are Vlachs, but the Volokhi have also been identified with either Romans or Franks annexing Pannonia (for instance, by Lubor Niederle is a representative of the first approach, and Dennis Deletant and Vladimir Petrukhin associates the Volokhi with the Franks).

The poem Nibelungenlied from the early 1200s mentions one "duke Ramunc of Wallachia" in the retinue of Attila the Hun. The poem alludes to the Vlachs along with the Russians, Greeks, Poles and Pechenegs, and may refer to a "Wallachia" east of the Carpathians. The identification of the Vlachs and the Bolokhoveni of the Hypatian Chronicle whose land bordered on the Principality of Halych is not unanimously accepted by historians (for instance, Victor Spinei refuses it).

== Archaeological data ==
=== North of the Lower Danube ===
Table: Number of settlements with archaeological finds in three Transylvanian counties
Period	Cluj (1992)	Alba (1995)	Mureș (1995)
Pre-Roman (5th century BC–1st century AD)	59 (20%)	111 (33%)	252 (28%)
Roman (106–270s)	144 (50%)	155 (47%)	332 (37%)
270s–390s	40 (14%)	67 (20%)	79 (9%)
5th century	40 (14%)	67 (20%)	49 (6%)
6th century	40 (14%)	67 (20%)	48 (6%)
7th century	40 (14%)	67 (20%)	40 (5%)
8th century	40 (14%)	67 (20%)	39 (5%)
9th century	40 (14%)	67 (20%)	19 (2%)
10th century	40 (14%)	67 (20%)	16 (2%)
11th century–14th century	47 (16%)	67 (20%)	
Total number	290	333	874

Tumuli erected for a cremation rite appeared in Oltenia and in Transylvania around 100 BC, thus preceding the emergence of the Dacian kingdom. Their rich inventory has analogies in archaeological sites south of the Danube. Although only around 300 graves from the next three centuries have been unearthed in Romania, they represent multiple burial rites, including ustrinum cremation and inhumation. New villages in the Mureș valley prove a demographic growth in the 1st century BC. Fortified settlements were erected on hilltops, mainly in the Orăștie Mountains, but open villages remained the most common type of settlement. In contrast with the finds of 25,000 Roman denarii and their local copies, imported products were virtually missing in Dacia. The interpretations of Geto-Dacian archaeological findings are problematic because they may be still influenced by methodological nationalism.

The conquering Romans destroyed all fortresses and the main Dacian sanctuaries around 106 AD. All villages disappeared because of the demolition. Roman settlements built on the location of former Dacian ones have not been identified yet. However, the rural communities at Boarta, Cernat, and other places used "both traditional and Roman items", even thereafter. Objects representing local traditions have been unearthed at Roman villas in Aiudul de Sus, Deva and other places as well. A feature of the few types of native pottery which continued to be produced in Roman times is the "Dacian cup", a mostly hand-made mug with a wide rim, which was used even in military centers. The use of a type of tall cooking pot indicates the survival of traditional culinary practices as well.

Colonization and the presence of military units gave rise to the emergence of most towns in "Dacia Traiana": for instance, Ulpia Traiana Sarmizegetusa was founded for veterans, Apulum and Potaissa started to develop as canabae. Towns were the only places where the presence of Christians can be assumed based on objects bearing Christian symbolism, including a lamp and a cup decorated with crosses, which have been dated to the Roman period. Rural cemeteries characterized by burial rites with analogies in sites east of the Carpathians attest to the presence of immigrant "barbarian" communities, for instance, at Obreja and Soporu de Câmpie. Along the northwestern frontiers of the province, "Przeworsk" settlements were unearthed at Boinești, Cehăluț, and other places.

Archaeological finds suggest that attacks against Roman Dacia became more intensive from the middle of the 3rd century: an inscription from Apulum hails Emperor Decius (r. 249–251) as the "restorer of Dacia"; and coin hoards ending with pieces minted in this period have been found. Inscriptions from the 260s attest that the two Roman legions of Dacia were transferred to Pannonia Superior and Italy. Coins bearing the inscription "DACIA FELIX" minted in 271 may reflect that Trajan's Dacia still existed in that year, but they may as well refer to the establishment of the new province of "Dacia Aureliana".

The differentiation of archaeological finds from the periods before and after the Roman withdrawal is not simple, but Archiud, Obreja, and other villages produced finds from both periods. In general, objects dating after the withdrawal are much more primitive, however, some elements of provincial Roman culture survived, particularly in pottery, but also in other areas of production, such as the one regarding the typical provincial Roman brooches. Towns have also yielded evidence on locals staying behind. For instance, in Ulpia Traiana Sarmizegatusa, at least one building was inhabited even in the 4th century, and a local factory continued to produce pottery, although "in a more restricted range". Roman coins from the 3rd and 4th centuries, mainly minted in bronze, were found in Banat where small Roman forts were erected in the 290s. Coins minted under Emperor Valentinian I (r. 364–375) were also found in Ulpia Traiana Sarmizegetusa, where the gate of the amphitheater was walled at an uncertain date. A votive plate found near a spring at Biertan bears a Latin inscription dated to the 4th century, and has analogies in objects made in the Roman Empire. Whether this donarium belonged to a Christian missionary, to a local cleric or layman or to a pagan Goth making an offering at the spring is still debated by archaeologists.

A new cultural synthesis, the "Sântana de Mureș-Chernyakhov culture", spread through the plains of Moldavia and Wallachia in the early 4th century. It incorporated elements of the "Wielbark culture" of present-day Poland and of local tradition. More than 150 "Sântana de Mureș-Chernyakhov" settlements suggest that the territory experienced a demographic growth. Three sites in the Eastern Carpathians already inhabited in the previous century (Note: Botoșana, Dodești, and Mănoaia (Heather, Matthews 1991, p. 91.).) prove the natives' survival as well. Growing popularity of inhumation burials also characterizes the period. "Sântana de Mureș-Chernyakhov" cemeteries from the 4th century were also unearthed in Transylvania. Coin hoards ending with pieces from the period between 375 and 395 unearthed at Bistreț, Gherla, and other settlements point to a period of uncertainty. Featuring elements of the "Przeworsk" and "Sântana de Mureș-Chernyakhov" cultures also disappeared around 400. Archaeological sites from the next centuries have yielded finds indicating the existence of scattered communities bearing different traditions. Again, cremation became the most widespread burial rite east of the Carpathians, where a new type of building – sunken huts with an oven in the corner – also appeared. The heterogeneous vessel styles were replaced by the more uniform "Suceava-Șipot" archaeological horizon of hand made pottery from the 550s.

In contrast with the regions east of the Carpathians, Transylvania experienced the spread of the "row grave" horizon of inhumation necropolises in the 5th century, also known from the same period in Austria, Bohemia, Transdanubia and Thuringia. At the same time, large villages appeared in Crișana and Transylvania, in most cases in places where no earlier habitation has yet been proven. Moreover, imported objects with Christian symbols, including a fish-shaped lamp from Lipova, and a "Saint Menas flask" from Moigrad, were unearthed. However, only about 15% of the 30 known "row grave" cemeteries survived until the late 7th century. They together form the distinct "Band-Noșlac" group of graveyards which also produced weapons and other objects of Western or Byzantine provenance.

The earliest examples in Transylvania of inhumation graves with a corpse buried, in accordance with nomadic tradition, with remains of a horse were found at Band. The "Gâmbaș group" of cemeteries emerged in the same period, producing weapons similar to those found in the Pontic steppes. Sunken huts appeared in the easternmost zones of Transylvania around the 7th century. Soon the new horizon of "Mediaș" cemeteries, containing primarily cremation graves, spread along the rivers of the region. The "Nușfalău-Someșeni" cemeteries likewise follow the cremation rite, but they produced large tumuli with analogies in the territories east of the Carpathians.

In the meantime, the "Suceava-Șipot horizon" disappeared in Moldavia and Wallachia, and the new "Dridu culture" emerged on both sides of the Lower Danube around 700. Thereafter the region again experienced demographic growth. For instance, the number of settlements unearthed in Moldavia grew from about 120 to about 250 from the 9th century to the 11th century. Few graveyards yielding artifacts similar to "Dridu cemeteries" were also founded around Alba Iulia in Transylvania. The nearby "Ciumbrud group" of necropolises of inhumation graves point at the presence of warriors. However, no early medieval fortresses unearthed in Transylvania, including Cluj-Mănăștur, Dăbâca, and Șirioara, can be definitively dated earlier than the 10th century.

Small inhumation cemeteries of the "Cluj group", characterized by "partial symbolic horse burials", appeared at several places in Banat, Crișana, and Transylvania including at Biharia, Cluj and Timișoara around 900. Cauldrons and further featuring items of the "Saltovo-Mayaki culture" of the Pontic steppes were unearthed in Alba Iulia, Cenad, Dăbâca, and other settlements. A new custom of placing coins on the eyes of the dead was also introduced around 1000. "Bijelo Brdo" cemeteries, a group of large graveyards with close analogies in the whole Carpathian Basin, were unearthed at Deva, Hunedoara and other places. The east–west orientation of their graves may reflect Christian influence, but the following "Citfalău group" of huge cemeteries that appeared in royal fortresses around 1100 clearly belong to a Christian population.

Romanian archaeologists propose that a series of archaeological horizons that succeeded each other in the lands north of the Lower Danube in the early Middle Ages support the continuity theory. In their view, archaeological finds at Brateiu (in Transylvania), Ipotești (in Wallachia) and Costișa (in Moldavia), part of the Ipotești-Ciurel-Cândești Culture, represent the Daco-Roman stage of the Romanians' ethnogenesis which ended in the 6th century. The next ("Romanic") stage can be detected through assemblages unearthed in Ipotești, Botoșana, Hansca and other places which were dated to the 7th-8th centuries. Finally, the Dridu culture is said to be the evidence for the "ancient Romanian" stage of the formation of the Romanian people. In contrast to these views, Opreanu emphasizes that the principal argument of the hypothesis—the presence of artefacts imported from the Roman Empire and their local copies in allegedly "Daco-Roman" or "Romanic" assemblages—is not convincing, because close contacts between the empire and the neighboring Slavs and Avars is well-documented. He also underlines that Dridu culture developed after a "cultural discontinuity" that followed the disappearance of the previous horizons. Regarding both the Slavs and Romanians as sedentary populations, Alexandru Madgearu also underlines that the distinction of "Slavic" and "Romanian" artefacts is difficult, because archaeologists can only state that these artifacts could hardly be used by nomads. He proposes that "The wheel-made pottery produced on the fast wheel (as opposed to the tournette), which was found in several settlements of the eighth, ninth, and tenth centuries, may indicate the continuation of Roman traditions" in Transylvania.

Thomas Nägler proposes that a separate "Ciugud culture" represents the Vlach population of southern Transylvania. He also argues that two treasures from Cârțișoara and Făgăraș also point at the presence of Vlachs. Both hoards contain Byzantine coins ending with pieces minted under Emperor John II Komnenos who died in 1143. Tudor Sălăgean proposes that these treasures point at a local elite with "at least" economic contacts with the Byzantine Empire. Paul Stephenson argues that Byzantine coins and jewellery from this period, unearthed at many places in Hungary and Romania, are connected to salt trade.

According to Florin Curta, no indication of a migration in the 10th century from the south to the north of the Danube have been found. Many sites excavated from the 10th century in the region of Romania show signs of being built in the previous 100 or 200 years, while in those that were started in the 10th century the ceramic is no different than what was previously used in the region, and most of the animal bones discovered were from horned cattle and pigs, not sheep or goats which are usually associated with transhumant herding.

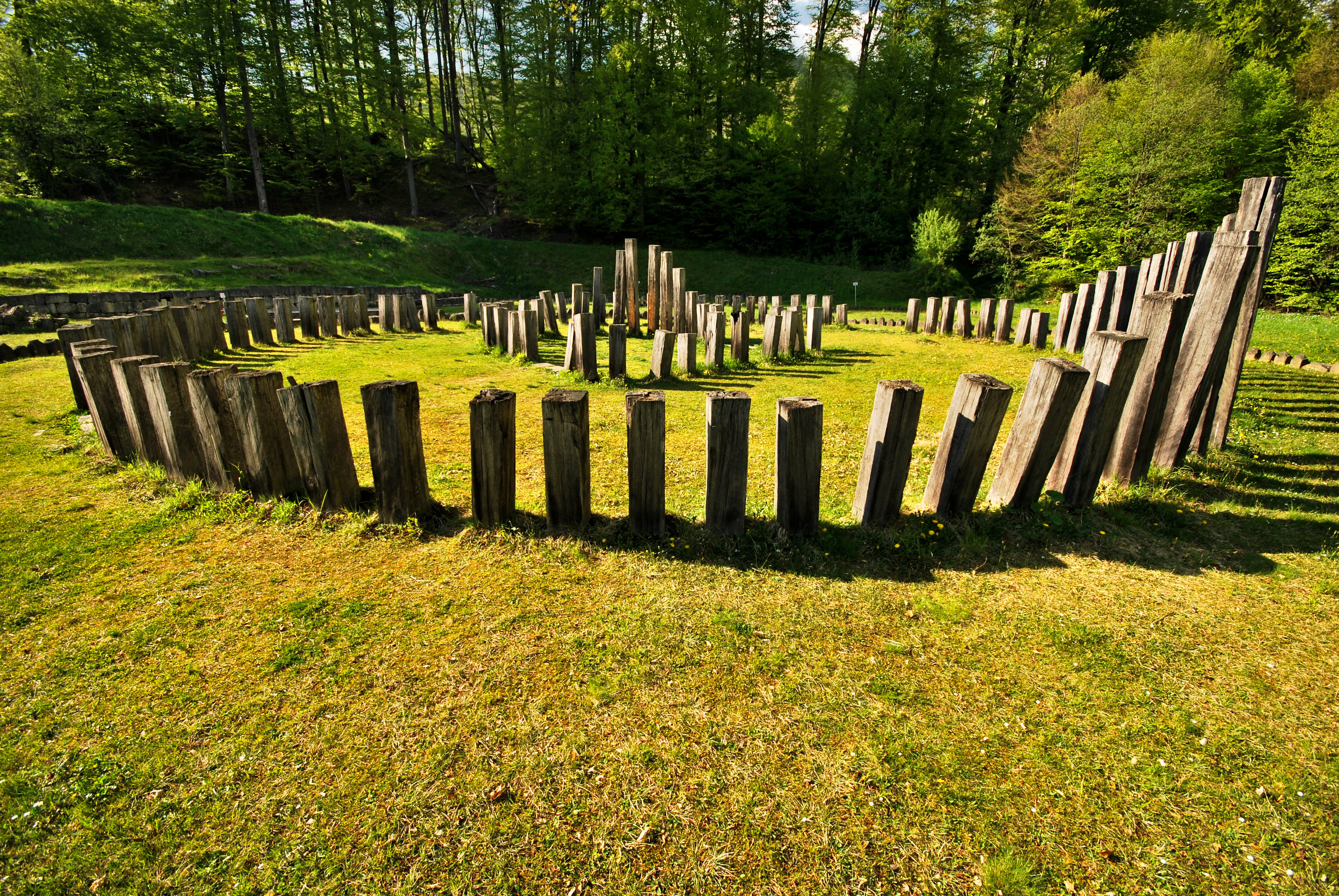
Ruins of a Dacian sanctuary at Sarmizegetusa Regia

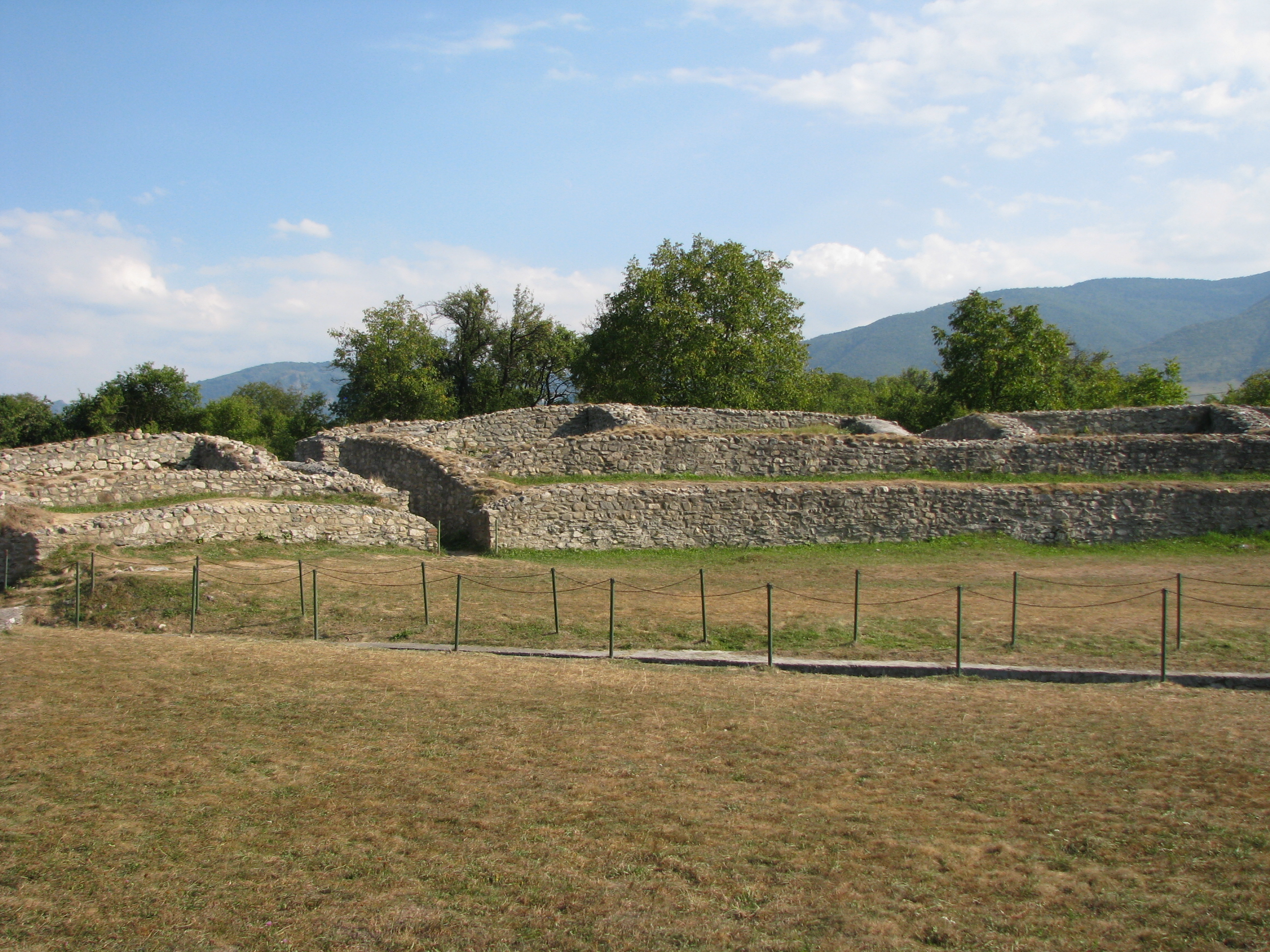
Ruins of the Roman amphitheatre at Ulpia Traiana Sarmizegetusa

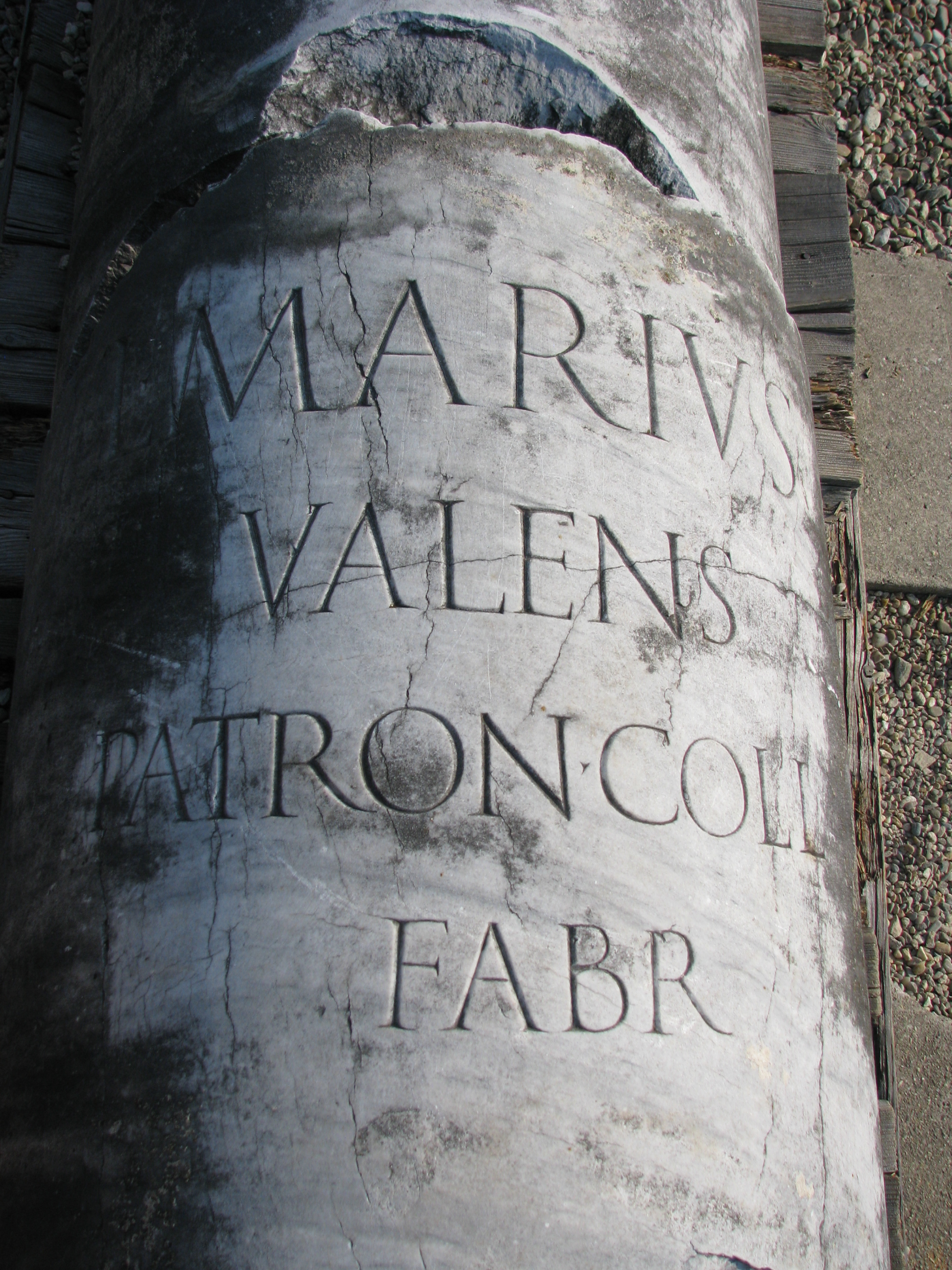
Latin inscription in Ulpia Traiana Sarmizegetusa

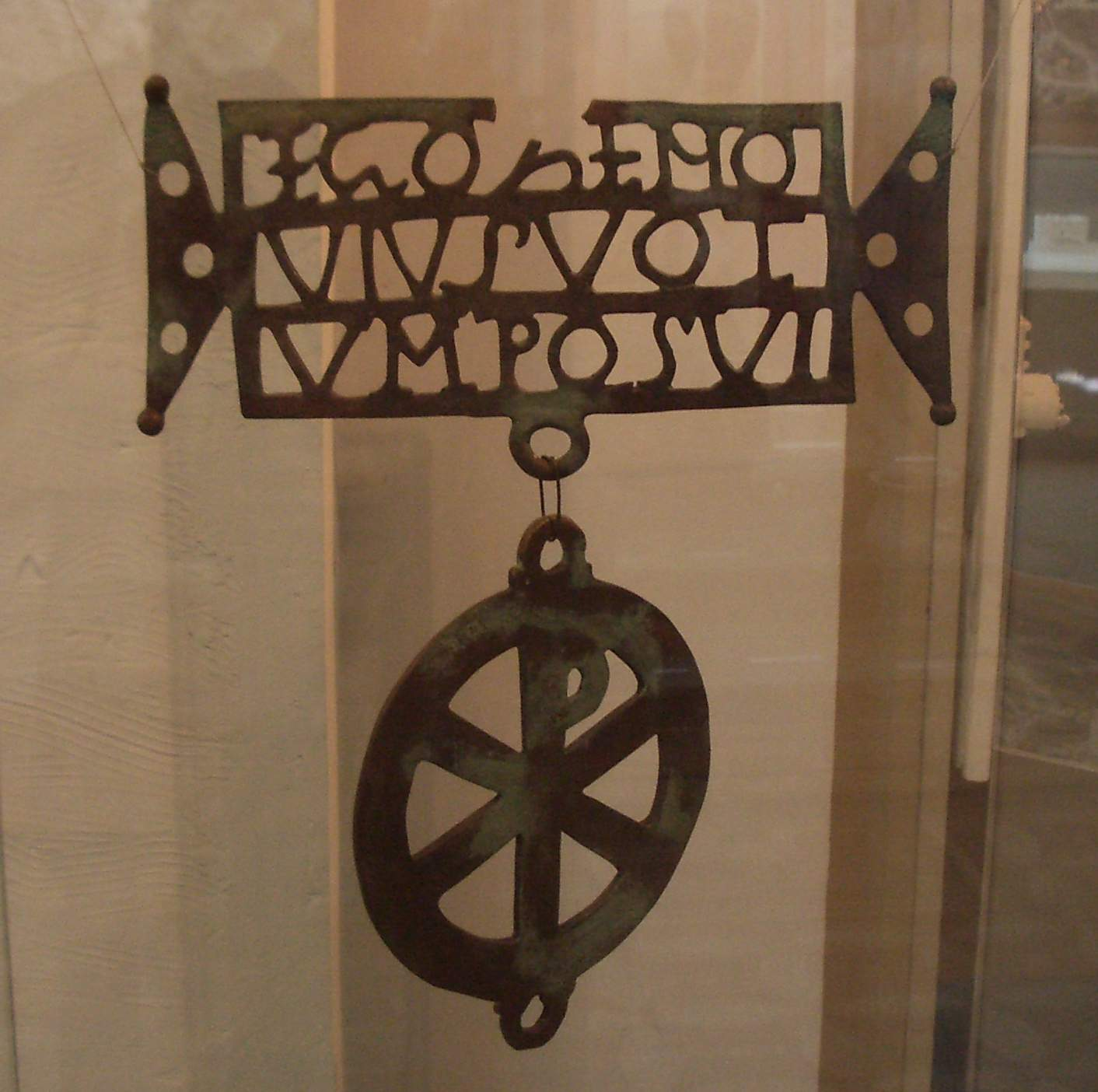
The 4th-century Biertan Donarium with the Latin writing "EGO ZENOVIUS VOTUM POSVI" (i.e. 'I, Zenovius, brought this offering.')

=== Central and Northern Balkans ===
Fortified settlements built on hill-tops characterized the landscape in Illyricum before the Roman conquest. In addition, pile dwellings formed villages along the rivers Sava and its tributaries. Roman coins unearthed in the northwestern regions may indicate that trading contacts between the Roman Empire and Illyricum began in the 2nd century BC, but piracy, quite widespread in this period, could also contribute to their cumulation. The first Roman road in the Balkans, the Via Egnatia which linked Thessaloniki with Dyrrhachium was built in 140 BC. Byllis and Dyrrhachium, the earliest Roman colonies were founded a century later. The Romans established a number of colonies for veterans and other towns, including Emona, Siscia, Sirmium and Iovia Botivo, in the next four centuries.

Hand-made pottery of local tradition remained popular even after potter's wheel was introduced by the Romans. Likewise, as is demonstrated by altars dedicated to Illyrian deities at Bihać and Topusko, native cults survived the Roman conquest. Latin inscriptions on stone monuments prove the existence of a native aristocracy in Roman times. Native settlements flourished in the mining districts in Upper Moesia up until the 4th century. Native names and local burial rites only disappeared in these territories in the 3rd century. In contrast, the frontier region along the Lower Danube in Moesia had already in the 1st century AD transformed into "a secure Roman-only zone" (Brad Bartel), from where the natives were moved.

Emperors born in Illyricum, a common phenomenon of the period, erected a number of imperial residences at their birthplaces. For instance, a palace was built for Maximianus Herculius near Sirmium, and another for Constantine the Great in Mediana. New buildings, rich burials and late Roman inscriptions show that Horreum Margi, Remesiana, Siscia, Viminacium, and other centers of administration also prospered under these emperors. Archaeological research – including the large cemeteries unearthed at Ulpianum and Naissus – shows that Christian communities flourished in Pannonia and Moesia from the 4th century. Inscriptions from the 5th century point at Christian communities surviving the destruction brought by the Huns at Naissus, Viminacium and other towns of Upper Moesia. In contrast, villae rusticae which had been centers of agriculture from the 1st century disappeared around 450. Likewise, forums, well planned streets and other traditional elements of urban architecture ceased to exist. For instance, Sirmium "disintegrated into small hamlets emerging in urban areas that had not been in use until then" after 450. New fortified centers developed around newly erected Christian churches in Sirmium, Novae, and many other towns by around 500. In contrast with towns, there are only two archaeological sites (Note: At Novgrad in Bulgaria and at Slava Rusă in Romania (Barford 2001, p. 60.).) from this period identified as rural settlements.

Under Justinian the walls of Serdica, Ulpianum and many other towns were repaired. He also had hundreds of small forts erected along the Lower Danube, at mountain passes across the Balkan Mountains and around Constantinople. Inside these forts small churches and houses were built. Pollen analysis suggest that the locals cultivated legumes within the walls, but no other trace of agriculture have been identified. They were supplied with grain, wine and oil from distant territories, as it is demonstrated by the great number of amphorae unearthed in these sites which were used to transport these items to the forts. Most Roman towns and forts in the northern parts of the Balkans were destroyed in the 570s or 580s. Although some of them were soon restored, all of them were abandoned, many even "without any signs of violence", in the early 7th century.

The new horizon of "Komani-Kruja" cemeteries emerged in the same century. They yielded grave goods with analogies in many other regions, including belt buckles widespread in the whole Mediterranean Basin, rings with Greek inscriptions, pectoral crosses, and weapons similar to "Late Avar" items. Most of them are situated in the region of Dyrrhachium, but such cemeteries were also unearthed at Viničani and other settlements along the Via Egnatia. "Komani-Kruja" cemeteries ceased to exist in the early 9th century. John Wilkes proposes that they "most likely" represent a Romanized population, while Florin Curta emphasizes their Avar features. Archaeological finds connected to a Romance-speaking population have also been searched in the lowlands to the south of the Lower Danube. For instance, Uwe Fiedler mentions that inhumation graves yielding no grave goods from the period between the 680s and the 860s may represent them, although he himself rejects this theory.

Historian Florin Curta, supporting his view on studies made by Bulgarian archaeologist Rasho Rashev, points that the region of Bregalnica river, where Schramm theorised the ethnogenesis of Romanians to start, did not show any signs of post-Roman habitations until around 800 CE when early Bulgarian culture took hold. Moreover, from an archaeological point of view, there is a clear increase in population in the wider region of nowadays Republic of North Macedonia after 900 CE with no signs of emigration.

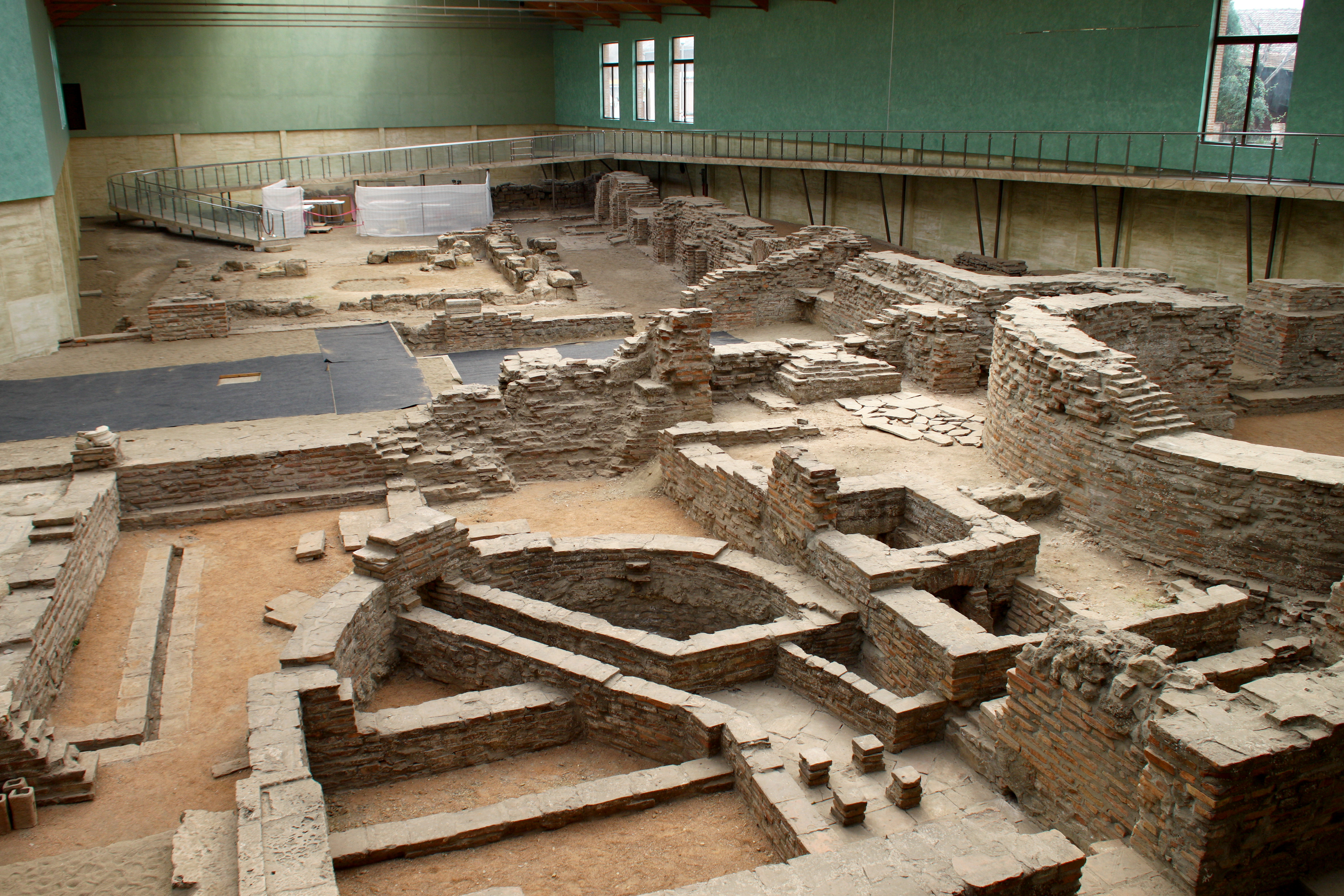
Ruins of the imperial palace in Sirmium

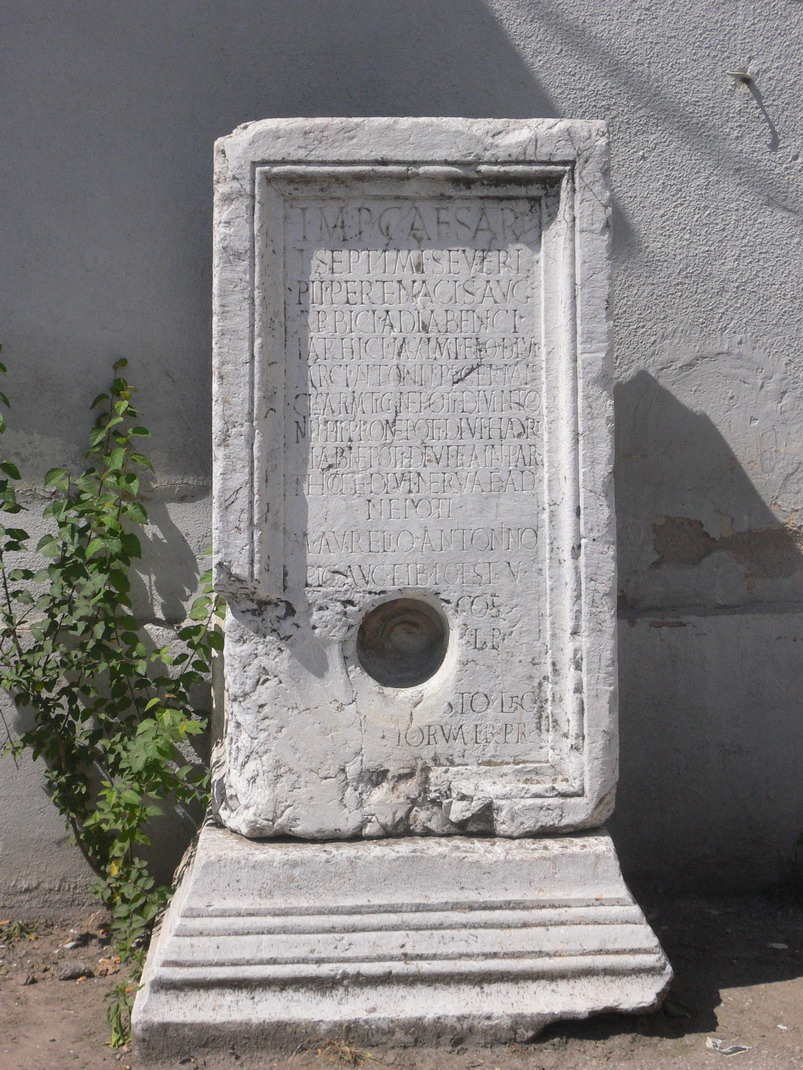
Latin inscription in Remesiana

== Linguistic approach ==
=== Development of Romanian ===
The formation of Proto-Romanian (or Common Romanian) from Vulgar Latin started in the 5th-7th centuries and was completed in the 8th century. The common language split into variants during the 10th-12th centuries. The Romanian dialects spoken to the north of the Danube display a "remarkable unity". Primarily the use of different words differentiate them, because their phonology is quite uniform. Linguist Gabriela Pană Dindelegan (who accepts the continuity theory) asserts that the Romanian shepherds' seasonal movements, and commercial contacts across the mountains secured the preservation of language unity. From another point of view, Paul Wexler proposes that the "relative recency of the Romance-speaking settlement" is a more plausible explanation, because the levelling effect of migrations is well-documented (for instance, in eastern Germany, and along the western coasts of the USA). Some Eastern Romance variants retained more elements of their Latin heritage than others. Primarily, the dialects of the peripheral areas (like Maramureș and Moldavia) preserved archaic linguistic features. For instance, the Maramureș subdialect of Romanian still uses both the ancient -a ending of verbs, and the Latin word for sand (arină) instead of standard nisip (a Slavic loanword), and Aromanian kept dozens of words—including arină, oarfăn ("orphan") and mes ("month")—lost in other variants. Emphasizing that western Transylvania used to be an integral part of Dacia Traiana, Nandriș concludes that "Transylvania was the centre of linguistic expansion", because the Transylvanian dialects preserved Latin words which were replaced by loanwords in other variants; furthermore, place names with the archaic -ești ending abound in the region.

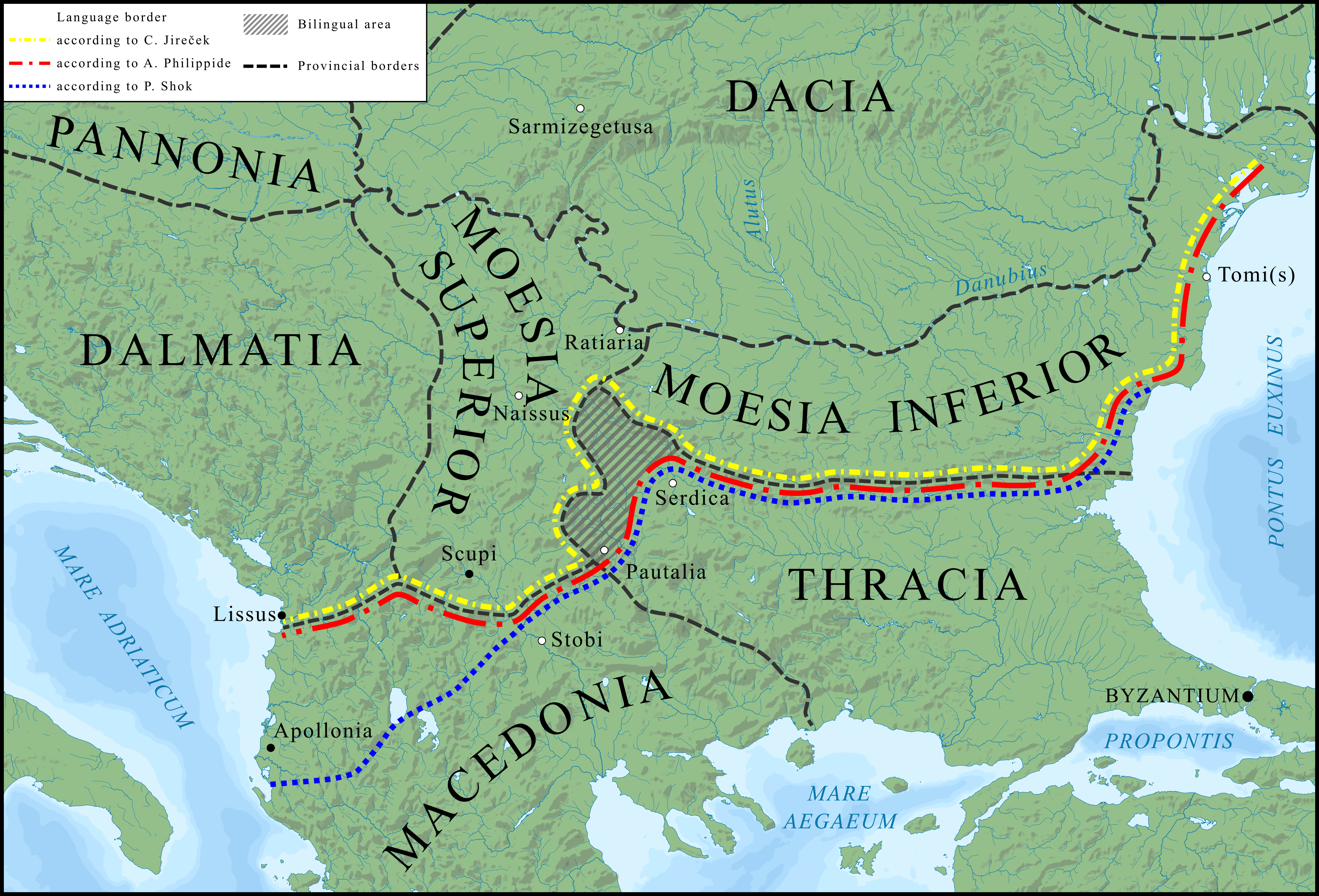
The Jireček Line is a conceptual boundary which divides the influence of the Latin (in the north) and Greek (in the south) languages during the rule of Roman Empire until the 4th century.

There are about 90 words of substrate origin. The largest semantic field (46 out the 89 considered certain to be of substratum) is formed by words describing nature: terrain, flora and fauna, and about 30% of these words with Albanian cognate describing pastoral life The substrate language has been identified as 'Thraco-Dacian', 'Thracian', or 'Daco-Moesian', but the origin of these words—Albanian, Thraco-Dacian or an unidentified third language—is actually uncertain. When analyzing the historical circumstances of the adoption of these words, linguist Kim Schulte asserts that initially the "political and cultural dominance of the Romans" defined the relationship between the Latin-speaking groups and speakers of the substrate language, but the two communities continued to live side by side, communicating "on regular basis about everyday matters regarding their pastoral activity and the natural environment" even after the end of Roman rule.

About 70-90 possible substrate words have Albanian cognates, and 29 terms are probably loanwords from Albanian. Similarities between Romanian and Albanian are not limited to their common Balkan features and the assumed substrate words: the two languages share calques and proverbs, and display analogous phonetic changes. Some linguists suppose that the substratum of Eastern Romance was an Indo-European language closely related to Albanian, or perhaps even the direct ancestor of Albanian. Romanian linguist Marius Sala, who supports the continuity theory, argues that 'Thraco-Dacian' was "a variant of Thracian from which Albanian originated". However, in current historical linguistics the documented Thracian material clearly points to a different language than Albanian or its reconstructed precursor. Bulgarian linguist Vladimir I. Georgiev, who introduced the 'Daco-Mysian' linguistic hypothesis, different from Thracian, proposed that both Albanian and Romanian developed in the "Daco-Mysian region" (encompassing Dacia to the north of the Lower Danube, and Moesia to the south of the river). He describes Romanian as a "completely Romanized Daco-Mysian", and Albanian as a "semi-Romanized Daco-Mysian" that was spoken in Dardania probably since the 2nd millennium BCE or not later than circa 500 BCE. Georgiev's claim that Albanian is a direct descendant of 'Daco-Mysian' is highly based on speculations that have been thoroughly dismantled by other scholars. On the other hand, proponents of the immigrationist theory of Romanian regard these similarities as an important evidence for the Romanians' south-Danubian homeland. In particular, Schramm proposes that the Romanians' ancestors were Roman refugees who settled near the native pastoralist population of the mountains in the central Balkans in the 5th-6th centuries; they could only take possession of the highest mountain pastures where they lived surrounded by the semi-sedentary Proto-Albanians for centuries.

Every Romance language inherited about 2,000 words directly from Latin. Around one-fifth of the entries of the 1958 edition of the Dictionary of the Modern Romanian have directly been inherited from Latin. The core vocabulary is to a large degree Latin, including the most frequently used 2500 words. More than 75% of the words in the semantic fields of sense perception, quantity, kinship and spatial relations are of Latin origin, but the basic lexicons of religion and of agriculture have also been preserved. More than 200 Latin words that other Romance languages preserved are missing in Romanian, but about 100 Latin terms were inherited only by Romanian. The preservation of the latter terms—including creștin ("Christian") and împărat ("emperor")—was due to their frequent use, according to Sala. Proponents of the continuity theory are convinced that the preservation or lack of certain Latin terms reveal that Romanian developed north of Lower Danube. One of these terms is the Latin word for gold (aurum), preserved in Daco-Romanian, but lost in Aromanian and Istro-Romanian. For Nandriș, the word is important evidence for the Romanians' continuous presence in Transylvania, because Romanian mountaineers owned many Transylvanian gold mines in Modern Times, and Nandriș thinks that newcomers would not have been allowed to open mines in the province.

The Latin terms for fig tree (ficus) and chestnut (castaneus) were kept in Aromanian and Megleno-Romanian, but they disappeared from Daco-Romanian. Nandriș and Sala say that this fact is also a clear testimony for the Daco-Romanians' north-Danubian homeland, because these plants did not grow there. Nandriș asserts that the semantic evolution of certain inherited Latin words also supports the continuity theory. For instance, he refers to the development of Latin terminus ("border, boundary, frontier") into Daco-Romanian țărm ("embankment, sea-shore, river bank"), proposing that this must have occurred north of the Lower Danube after the Roman withdrawal which made the river the empire's northern frontier. He also mentions a Latin inscription in Dacia Traiana which contains the Latin word for moon (luna) with the meaning for month, because Daco-Romanian displays a similar semantic development. Other scholars attribute the same change to Slavic influence.

Romanian reflects most changes of Latin which occurred in the 2nd-6th centuries. In Gábor Vékony's view, only uninterrupted contacts between the ancestors of Romanians, Dalmatians, Italians and other Romance peoples within the Roman Empire could secure the adoption of these changes, which excludes the north-Danubian territories, abandoned by the Romans in the late 3rd century. Vékony and Schramm also emphasize that the meaning of almost a dozen of inherited Latin terms changed in parallel in Romanian and Albanian, suggesting that contacts between the speakers of Proto-Romanian and Proto-Albanian were frequent. For instance, the Latin word for dragon (draco) developed into Daco-Romanian drac and Albanian dreq, both meaning devil; Daco-Romanian bătrîn and Albanian vjetër (both meaning old) descend from the Latin term for veteran (veteranus). Furthermore, Romanian sat ("village") was not directly inherited from Latin, but borrowed from Albanian fshat ("village"), the direct continuation of Latin fossatum ("military camp"). However, Nicolae Saramandu states that the similarities between Romanian and Albanian do not presuppose a limited space for coexistence, in the past, of the speakers of the two languages; the similarities in question are satisfactorily explained by a common heritage, in a large Romanized space in the north and south of the Danube, "from the Carpathians to the Pindus".

In addition to words of Latin or of possible substratum origin, loanwords make up more than 40% (according to certain estimations 60-80%) of the Romanian vocabulary. Schulte notes that even "relatively basic words denoting continually present meanings, such as features of the natural environment, are frequently borrowed". The names for most species of fish of the Danube and of dozens of other animals living in Romania are of Slavic origin. Dindelegan says that contacts with other peoples has not modified the "Latin structure of Romanian" and the "non-Latin grammatical elements" borrowed from other languages were "adapted to and assimilated by the Romance pattern". Nandriș also says that linguistic influences "are due to cultural intercourse" and do not reveal closer contacts.

While it has been widely accepted that there are no East Germanic loanwords in Romanian, more recent research has identified several potential candidates. The linguist Adrian Poruciuc proposes that about 70 words are of Old Germanic origin, also stating that many of these words may have entered into Romanian with Slavic mediation. Another linguist, Pârvu Boerescu, reasons that the words teafăr ("healthy"/"unharmed") and viscol/vicol ("blizzard") are likely loanwords from an Old Germanic language. A third, Andrea Bărgan states that "the idea of a probable Old Germanic origin of the Romanian term iele ("evil fairies") "should not be regarded as out-of-place", whilst the current etymological dictionary of the Romanian Academy (which only covers words up to the letter D) provides possible Old Germanic etymologies for bordei ("cottage"), burtă ("belly"), and butuc ("tree stump") and lists cioarec ("peasant trousers") as a term of probable Old Germanic origin. Scholars who accept the immigrationist theory emphasize that the perceived lack of East Germanic loanwords excludes that the Romanians' homeland was located north of the Lower Danube, because Germanic tribes dominated these lands from the 270s to the 560s. Accepting this as a decisive argument, Bogdan P. Hasdeu placed it in Oltenia, as he falsely believed the Germanic tribes didn't occupy that region. Stelian Brezeanu argues that the absence of East Germanic loanwords is "basically the consequence of the gap" between the Orthodox Romanians and the Arian Germans. He adds that the Daco-Romans assimilated the last Eastern Germanic groups in Transylvania before the middle of the 7th century. Linguist Sala mentions that the Germanic peoples stayed in the former Dacia Traiana province "for a relatively brief span of time, only a couple of centuries", without maintaining close contacts with the Daco-Romans. Nandriș says that those who propose a south-Danubian homeland "on the ground of the lack of Germanic elements" in Romanian "have the same argument against them", because Germanic tribes also settled in the Balkans in the early Middle Ages, also specifying that "a few loanwords seem to be of Old Germanic origin". In contrast, Schramm proposes that both Proto-Romanian and Proto-Albanian must have developed in the central Balkan regions where no Germanic tribes settled, because direct borrowings from East Germanic are also missing in Albanian.

Slavic loanwords make up about one-fifth of Romanian vocabulary. According to certain estimations, terms of Slavic origin are more numerous than the directly inherited Latin roots, although the Slavic loanwords often replaced or doubled the Latin terms. All Eastern Romance variants contain the same 80 Slavic loanwords, indicating that they were borrowed during the Common Romanian period. The vast majority of Slavic loanwords display phonetic changes occurring after around 800. To explain the lack of early borrowings, Brezeanu supposes that the Christian Proto-Romanians and the pagan Proto-Slavs did not mix. Schulte proposes that the Proto-Romanians and Proto-Slavs lived in close proximity under Avar rule, but neither group could achieve cultural dominance, because the Avars formed the elite. In contrast, Schramm argues that the only explanation for the lack of early Slavic borrowings is that the Proto-Albanians separated the Proto-Romanians (who lived in the mountains in the central Balkans) from the agriculturalist Proto-Slavs (who inhabited the lowlands) for centuries.

The most intensive phase of borrowings form Slavic (specifically from South Slavic) tongues started around 900. The proportion of Slavic loanwords is especially high (20-25%) in the Romanians' religious, social and political vocabulary, but almost one-fifth of the Romanian terms related to emotions, values, speech and languages were also borrowed from Slavs. Slavic loanwords tend to have positive connotations in "antonym pairs with one element borrowed from Slavic". Romanians also adopted dozens of Latin words through Slavic mediation. Wexler proposes that Slavic patterns gave rise to the development of significant part of about 900 Romanian words that are deemed to descend from hypothetical Latin words (that is words reconstructed on the basis of their Romanian form). Linguists often attribute the development of about 10 phonological and morphological features of Romanian to Slavic influence, but there is no consensual view. For instance, contacts with Slavic-speakers allegedly contributed to the appearance of the semi-vowel [y] before the vowel [e] at the beginning of basic words and to the development of the vocative case in Romanian.

Linguist Kim Schulte says, the significant common lexical items and the same morpho-syntactic structures of the Romanian and Bulgarian (and Macedonian) languages "indicates that there was a high decree of bilingualism" in this phase of the development of Romanian. Brezeanu argues that contacts between the Romanians' ancestors and the Slavs became intense due to the arrival of Bulgarian clerics to the lands north of the Lower Danube after the conversion of Bulgaria to Christianity. Thereafter, Brezeanu continues, Slavs formed the social and political elite for a lengthy period, as demonstrated both by loanwords (such as voivode and cneaz, both referring to the leaders of the Vlach communities) and by the semantic development of the term rumân (which referred to Wallachian serfs in the Middle Ages). Schramm argues that the Proto-Romanians' spread in the mountains in search for new pastures and the Slavicization of the Balkans suggest that close contacts developed between the Proto-Romanians and the Bulgarians in the 10th century.

Borrowings from Slavic languages show that there were "localized contacts" between Romanian and Slavic groups even after the disintegration of Common Romanian. The Daco-Romanian subdialects of Maramureș and Moldavia contains loanwords from Ukrainian, Polish and Russian. The Romanian form of loanwords from Ukrainian evidences that they were borrowed after the characteristic Ukrainian sound change from h to g was completed in the 12th century. Serbian influenced the subdialects spoken in Banat and Crișana from the 15th century. Bulgarian influenced the Wallachian subdialects even after Bulgarian ceased to influence other variants.

About 1.7% of Romanian words are of Greek origin. The earliest layer of Greek loanwords was inherited from the variant of Vulgar Latin from which Romanian descends. Schulte proposes that Byzantine Greek terms were adopted through close contacts between Romanian, South Slavic and Greek communities until the 10th century. However, H. Mihailescu proposed that all Byzantine Greek terms in Romanian are indirect loanwords from old Slavonic or Medieval Bulgarian not from a direct contact. Hungarian loanwords represent about 1.6% of Romanian vocabulary. According to Schulte, the Hungarian loanwords show that contacts between Romanians and Hungarians were limited to occasional encounters. On the other hand, Sala says that bilingualism must have existed. Loanwords from Pecheneg or Cuman are rare, but many Romanian leaders bore Cuman names, implying that they were of Cuman origin.

All neighboring peoples adopted a number of Romanian words connected to goat- and sheep-breeding. Romanian loanwords are rare in standard Hungarian, but abound in its Transylvanian dialects. In addition to place names and elements of the Romanian pastoral vocabulary, the Transylvanian Hungarians primarily adopted dozens of Romanian ecclesiastic and political terms to refer to specific Romanian institutions already before the mid-17th centuries (for instance, bojér, logofét, kalugyér and beszerika). The adoption of the Romanian terminology shows that the traditional Romanian institutions, which followed Byzantine patterns, significantly differed from their Hungarian counterparts.

Linguistic research plays a preeminent role in the construction of the way of life of the Romanians' ancestors, because "historical sources are almost silent". The Romanians preserved the basic Latin agricultural vocabulary, but adopted a significant number of Slavic technical terms for agricultural tools and techniques. Inherited terminology for motion is strikingly numerous, showing the preeminent role of transhumant pastoralism in medieval Romanians' economy. In his study dedicated to the formation of the Romanian language, Nandriș concludes that the Latin population was "reduced to a pastoral life in the mountains and to agricultural pursuits in the foothills of their pastoral lands" in the whole "Carpatho-Balkan area" (both to the north and to the south of the Lower Danube) after the collapse of the Roman rule. For historian Victor Spinei, the Slavic loanwords evince that the Romanians had already "practiced an advanced level of agriculture" before they entered into close contacts with the Slavs: otherwise they would not have needed the specialized terminology. Sala says that the Slavic terms "penetrated Romanian" because they designed the Slavs' more advanced tools which replaced the Romanians' ancestors obsolete tools.

Schramm concludes that the Proto-Romanians were pastoralists with superficial knowledge of agriculture, limited to the basic vocabulary and retained only because they regularly wintered their flocks on their sedentary neighbors' lands in the foothills. According to him, the adoption of Slavic (and later Hungarian) agricultural terminology clearly shows that the Romanians started to practice agriculture only at a later stage of their ethnogenesis. Other scholars, including historian Victor Spinei, state that the great number of names of crops (Note: For instance, Romanian grâu, Aromanian grănu, and Megleno-Romanian gron 'wheat' < Latin granum 'grain, seed'; Romanian secară, Aromanian and Megleno-Romanian sicară, Istro-Romanian secåre < Vulgar Latin secale 'rye'; Romanian and Istro-Romanian orz, Aromanian ordzu, Megleno-Romanian uarz < Latin hordeum 'barley'; and Romanian mei, Aromanian mel'u, Megleno-Romanian and Istro-Romanian mel' < Latin milium 'millet' (Mihăescu 1993, pp. 256-257.; Spinei 2009, p. 224).) and agricultural techniques (Note: For instance, Romanian ara, Aromanian and Megleno-Romanian arare and Istro-Romanian arå < Latin arare 'to plow' (Mihăescu 1993, p. 261.; Spinei 2009, p. 224).) directly inherited from Latin indicates "a very long continuity of agricultural practices". Grigore Brâncuș adds to this list that the majority of pomiculture, numerous apicultural, and all the swineherding terms complete a view of a mixed farming society involved in both the growing of crops and the raising of livestock.

=== Place names ===
Table: Romanian river names borrowed from German (G), Hungarian (H) or Slavic (S) in Transylvania
The names of the main rivers—Someș, Mureș and Olt—are inherited from Antiquity.
River	Tributaries		
Someș	Beregszó (H) > Bârsău; Lápos (H) > Lăpuș; Hagymás (H) > Hășmaș; Almás (H) > Almaș; Egregy (H) > Agrij; Szilágy (H) > Sălaj; *Krasъna (S) > (? Kraszna (H)) > **Crasna		
Someș	Lăpuș	Kékes (H) > Chechișel; *Kopalnik (S) > Cavnic	
Someș	Crasna	? > Zilah (H) > Zalău; Homoród (H) > Homorod	
Someș	Someșul Mic	Fenes (H) > Feneș; Füzes (H) > Fizeș; Kapus (H) > Căpuș; Nádas (H) > Nadăș; Fejérd (H) > Feiurdeni; *Lovъna (S) > Lóna (H) > Lonea; * ? (S) > Lozsárd (H) > Lujerdiu	
Someș	Someșul Mare	*Rebra (S) > Rebra; *Solova (S) > Sălăuța; Széples (H) > Țibleș; *Ielšava (S) > Ilosva (H) > Ilișua; *Ilva (S) > Ilva; Sajó (H) > Șieu; *Tiha (S) > Tiha	
Someș	Someșul Mare	Șieu	? > Budak (H) > Budac; *Bystritsa (S) > Bistrița; *Lъknitsa (S) > Lekence (H) > Lechința
Mureș	Liuts (S/?) > Luț; *Lъknitsa (S) > Lekence (H) > Lechința; Ludas (H) > Luduș; Aranyos (H) > Arieș; *Vъrbova (S) > Gârbova; Gyógy (H) > Geoagiu; *Ampeios (?) > *Ompei (S) > (Ompoly (H) > Ampoi (G) ?) > ***Ampoi; Homoród (H) > Homorod; *Bistra (S) > Bistra; Görgény (H) > Gurghiu; Nyárád (H) > Niraj; * Tîrnava (S) > Târnava; Székás (H) > Secaș; Sebes (H) > Sebeș; *Strĕl (S) > Strei; *Čъrna (S) > Cerna		
Mureș	Arieș	? > Abrud (H) > Abrud; *Trěskava (S) > Torockó (H) > Trascău; *Iar (S/?) > Iara; Hesdát (H) > Hășdate; *Turjъ (S) > Tur;	
Mureș	Sebeș	Székás (H) > Secaș; * Dobra (S) > Dobra; * Bistra (S) > > Bistra	
Olt	Kormos (H) > Cormoș; Homorod (H) > Homorod; * Svibiń (S) > Cibin; Hamorod (H) > Homorod River (Dumbrăvița); Sebes (H) > Sebeș; Árpás (H) > Arpaș; Forrenbach (G) > Porumbacu		
Olt	Cormoș	Vargyas (H) > Vârghiș	
Olt	Cibin	*Hartobach (G) > Hârtibaciu	
? unknown, uncertain; * the form is not documented; ** the Crasna now flows into the Tisa, but it was the Someș's tributary; *** Linguist Marius Sala says that the Ampoi form was directly inherited from Antiquity.

In an article dedicated to the development of the Romanian language, Nandriș states that the study of place names "does not solve the problem of the cradle of primitive" Romanian. In contrast to this view, Schramm says that the toponyms are crucial for the determination of the Romanians' homeland, because "the whole of Romania is threaded with toponyms which conclusively exclude any form of continuity there". Place names provide a significant proportion of modern knowledge of the extinct languages of Southeastern Europe. The names of the longest rivers in Romania— those longer than 500 kilometers (Note: Danube, Mureș, Olt, Prut, Siret and Tisa.)—are thought to be of Dacian origin. About twenty of their tributaries had names with probable Indo-European roots, also suggesting a Dacian etymology. (Note: For instance, the modern name of the river Ampoi may be connected to the Iranian words am ("with") and pel-/pal- ("color"), and the name of Săsar River has been linked to the Indo-European root *sar or *ser ("water", "to flow").) The Romans adopted the native names of the longest rivers after they conquered Dacia. (Note: for instance, Crisia for the Criș, Maris(sos) for the Mureș, *Samus for the Someș and Tibisis for the Timiș)

Linguists Oliviu and Nicolae Felecan say that the "preservation of river names from Antiquity until today is one of the most solid arguments" in favor of the continuity theory, because these names must have been "uninterruptedly transmitted" from the Dacians to the Romans, and then to the Daco-Romans. Sala also states that the Romanian forms of some ancient river names "are a conclusive argument" for the continuity theory. The three scholars specifically refer to the Romanian name of the Danube, Dunărea, proposing that it developed from a supposed native (Thraco-Dacian or Daco-Moesian) *Donaris form. They also emphasize that the names of six other rivers (Note: Argeș (from Ardesos), Criș (from Crisus or Crisia), Mureș (from Maris), Olt (from Alutus), Someș (from Samus) and (Timiș from Tibisis).) display phonetic changes—the development of the consonant "ʃ" from "s", and the vowel shift from "a" to "o"—featuring the 2nd- and 3rd-century form of the native language. In contrast to these views, Nandriș (although he also accepts the continuity theory) states that alone among the rivers in Dacia, the development of the name of the Criș from ancient Crisius would be in line with the phonetical evolution of Romanian.

Scholars who reject the continuity theory emphasize that the Romanian names of the large rivers show that the Romanians did not directly inherit them from their Latin-speaking ancestors. According to Vékony (who promotes the immigrationist theory), the Romanian name of the Danube demonstrates that the Romanians' ancestors lived far from it, because otherwise they should have preserved its Latin name, Danuvius. He also emphasizes that the hypothetical *Donaris form is not attested in written sources and Istros was the river's native name. According to Schramm, the early Slavs adopted the East Germanic name of the Danube, showing that a predominantly Gothic-speaking population inhabited the territory between the Slavs' homeland and the Lower Danube before the Slavs approached the river in the 5th century. Vékony proposes that the Romanians adopted the river's Cuman name, Dunay, when they reached the Danube during their northward expansion around 1100. In Schramm's view, the phonetic changes from "s" to "ʃ" in the names of five large rivers also contradict the continuity theory, because Latin did not contain the latter consonant, thus only non-Romanized natives could transmit it to the peoples who settled in the north-Danubian regions after the Romans abandoned them.

Similarly, historian László Makkai says that the change from "a" to "o" shows that a Slavic-speaking population mediated the ancient names of three large rivers to modern populations (including Romanians), because this vowel shift is attested in the development of the Slavic languages, but is alien to Romanian and other tongues spoken along the rivers. Linguists (including some proponents of the continuity theory) also accept a Slavic mediation which is undeniable in specific cases. (Note: For example, the modern name of the Cerna (which is similar to the Slavic word for black) obviously developed from ancient Dierna through the mediation of a Slavic-speaking population.) Still, Madgearu claims that the maintenance of nasalization of vowels in placenames such as Glâmboca or Lindina shows that they were adopted by Romanians before the denasalization of vowels occurred in Slavic, which happened approximately in the 9th century.

Around half of the longest tributaries of the large rivers—those which are longer than 200 kilometers—has a name of Slavic origin. (Note: Bistrița, Dâmbovița, Ialomița, Jijia, Târnava, and possibly Moldova.) In Schramm's view, the name of one of them, Dâmbovița, demonstrates that the Romanians reached Wallachia between around 900 and 1200, because it already reflects the change of the Proto-Bulgarian back vowel "ǫ", but it was borrowed before nasal vowels disappeared from most Bulgarian variants. One of longest tributaries, Bârlad bears a Turkic (Pecheneg or Cuman) name. Almost 50 watercourses (including small rivers and creeks) bear a name of Turkic origin in the Wallachian Plain and river names of Turkic origin also abound in southern Moldavia. The names of the litoral lakes in Dobruja are also of Turkic origin. To explain the great number of Turkic river names, historian Victor Spinei, who supports the continuity theory, proposes that these "bodies of water were not sufficiently important" to the sedentary local Romanians in contrast to the nomadic Turkic peoples who used them as important "permanent markers in the landscape" during their seasonal movements. The longest tributaries of the large rivers in Banat, Crișana and Transylvania had modern names of German, Hungarian, Slavic or Turkic origin, which were also adopted by the Romanians. (Note: For instance, the names of the tributaries of the Someșul Mic River are of Hungarian (Căpuș, Nadăș, and Fizeș) or Slavic (Lonea and Lujerdiu) origin.) These tributaries run through the most populated areas where "was a greater likelihood that their names would be lodged in the collective memory", according to Makkai. In immigrationists scholars' view, these river names prove that the presence of the Slavs, Hungarians, Transylvanian Saxons predated the arrival of the Romanians who thus must have crossed the Carpathians only after the first Transylvanian Saxon groups settled in southern Transylvania around 1150.

Many small rivers—all shorter than 100 kilometers—and creeks (Note: For instance, Baicu, Ghișa, Manciu.) bear a name of Romanian origin in Romania. Most of these watercourses run in the mountainous regions. Based on the Repedea name for the upper course of the river Bistrița (both names meaning "quick" in Romanian and Slavic, respectively), Nandris writes that translations from Romanian into Slavic could also create Romanian hydronyms. Madgearu also says that Bistrița is "most likely a translation" of the Romanian Repedea form. In his view, the distribution of the Romanian river names "coincides with that of a series of archaic cranial features within the restricted area of the Apuseni Mountains", evincing the early presence of a Romanian-speaking population in the mountainous regions of Transylvania. On the other hand, historian Pál Engel underlines that Romanian place names are dominant only in "areas of secondary human settlement" which "seem to have been colonised during the late Middle Ages".

Drobeta, Napoca, Porolissum, Sarmizegetusa and other settlements in Dacia Traiana bore names of local origin in Roman times. According to historian Coriolan H. Opreanu (who supports the continuity theory), the survival of the local names proves the native Dacians' presence in the province at the beginning of the Roman rule. Historian Endre Tóth (who accepts the immigrationist theory) remarks that the native names do not prove the continuity of Dacian settlements, especially because the Roman towns bearing local names developed from military camps and their establishment "generally entailed the annihilation of whatever Dacian settlement there might have been". Immigrationist scholars emphasize that the names of all Roman settlements attested in Dacia Traiana disappeared after the Romans abandoned the province, in contrast to the names of dozens of Roman towns in the south-Danubian provinces which survived until now. (Note: For instance, Naissus (Niš, Serbia), Poetovio (Ptuj, Slovenia), Scupi (Skopje, North Macedonia), Siscia (Sisak, Croatia).) In defense of the continuity theory, Sala proposes that the names of the towns vanished because the Huns destroyed them, but the Daco-Romans endured the Huns' rule in the villages.

Place names of certainly Slavic, (Note: For instance, Câlnic ("muddy place"), Straja ("guard"), Sumurducu ("stink"), and Ulciug ("highlanders") bear names of Slavic origin.) Hungarian (Note: Including, Agârbiciu ("alder mountain"), Hașag ("linden hill"), Hosasău ("long valley"), Tioltiur ("Slavic guard"), and Verveghiu ("dried stream's valley"), which have Hungarian names.) and German (Note: For instance, Nocrich ("new church") and Viscri ("white church") bear names of German origin.) origin can be found in great number in medieval royal charters pertaining to Banat, Crișana, Maramureș, and Transylvania. In the mountains between the rivers Arieș and Mureș and in the territory to the south of the Târnava Mare River, both the Romanians and the Transylvanian Saxons directly (without Hungarian mediation) adopted the Slavic place names. In almost all cases, when parallel Slavic-Hungarian or Slavic-German names are attested, (Note: Including, the adoption of Bălgrad instead of Hungarian Gyulafehérvár, and of Straja instead of Őregyház.) Romanians borrowed the Slavic forms, suggesting a long cohabitation of the Romanians and the Slavs or a close relationship between the two ethnic groups. The great number of place names of Slavic origin is a clear evidence for the presence of a Slavic-speaking population when the Hungarians started settling in the regions, according to a number of historians. On the other hand, historian Tudor Sălăgean (who supports the continuity theory) states that the name of Slavic origin of a settlement does not itself prove that Slavs inhabited it in the 10th-13th century. Sălăgean underlines that Romanians live in the same settlements in the 21st century and "what is possible in the 21st century was not less possible in 10th century". According to him, the adoption of the Slavic names by the Romanians in cases when a settlement bears parallel Hungarian or German and Slavic names proves that the Romanians and the Slavs had lived side by side in the same settlements already before the arrival of the Hungarians in the late 9th century. In Makkai's contrasting view, the direct adoption of Slavic place names by the Transylvanian Saxons and Romanians proves that significant Slavic-speaking groups lived in southern and central Transylvania when the first Transylvanian Saxon and Romanian groups moved to the region in the second half of the 12th century. Contrarily, Madgearu claims that the Romanians could not have known a Slavic placename such as Bălgrad if they migrated to the region after the Hungarian conquest and would have adopted the Hungarian name instead.

The earliest toponym of certain Romanian origin (Nucșoara from the Romanian word for "walnut") was recorded in the Kingdom of Hungary in 1359. According to Kristó, the late appearance of Romanian place names indicates that the Romanians insisted on their mobile way of life for a lengthy period after they penetrated into the kingdom and their first permanent settlements appeared only in the second half of the 14th century. The region near the confluence of the Argeș and Lower Danube is called Vlașca. According to Makkai, the name clearly shows that a small Romance-speaking community existed in Slavic environment in Wallachia. Madgearu proposes the hypothesis that the name Vlașca, similar to Vlăsia, could derive from Slavic Vlaga, meaning "swampy place".

No place names mentioned in Gesta Hungarorum in Transylvania and Banat are of Romanian origin, but mainly of Hungarian.

Numerous place names of Latin or Romanian origin can be detected in the lands south of the Lower Danube (in present-day Albania, Bulgaria, Bosnia-Hercegovina, Greece, Kosovo, Montenegro and Serbia). Place names of Latin origin abound in the region of Lake Shkodër, along the rivers Drin and Fan and other territories to the north of the Via Egnatia. According to John Wilkes, they are a clear evidence for the survival of a numerous Romance-speaking population—whom he associates with the "Romanoi" mentioned by Porphyrogenitus—until the 9th century. Schramm says that the names of at least eight towns in the same region, (Note: Including Elassona, Florina, and Veria.) likewise suggest the one-time presence of a Romance speaking population in their vicinity. In Schramm and Makkai's view, they are consequences of the well-documented 7th-century southward movement of the Latin-speaking groups from the northern Balkan provinces. Romanian place names (Note: For instance, Pasarel, Surdul, Vakarel, Durmitor, Pirlitor and Visitor.) are concentrated in the wider region of Vlasina (both in present-day Bulgaria and Serbia) and in Montenegro and Kosovo. These names still prove that a significant Romanian-speaking population used to inhabit these territories. In Makkai's view, significant groups of Romanians left these territories for the lands to the north of the Lower Danube from the late 12th century and those who stayed behind were assimilated by the neighboring Slavic peoples by the 15th century.

== DNA / Paleogenetics ==
The use of genetic data to supplement traditional disciplines has now become mainstream. Given the palimpsest nature of modern genetic diversity, more direct evidence has been sought from ancient DNA (aDNA). Although data from southeastern Europe is still at an incipient stage, general trends are already evident. For example, it has shown that the Neolithic revolution imparted a major demographic impact throughout Europe, disproving the Mesolithic adaptation scenario in its pure form. In fact, the arrival of Neolithic farmers might have been in at least two "waves", as suggested by a study which analysed mtDNA sequences from Romanian Neolithic samples. This study also shows that 'M_NEO' (Middle Neolithic populations that lived in what is present-day Romania/Transylvania) and modern populations from Romania are very close (but comparison with other populations of Neolithic Anatolian origin was not performed), in contrast with Middle Neolithic and modern populations from Central Europe. However, the samples extracted from Late Bronze Age DNA from Romania are farther from both of the previously mentioned. The authors have stated "Nevertheless, studies on more individuals are necessary to draw definitive conclusions." However, the study performed a "genetic analysis of a relatively large number of samples of Boian, Zau and Gumelnița cultures in Romania (n = 41) (M_NEO)"

Ancient DNA study on human fossils found in Costișa, Romania, dating from the Bronze Age shows "close genetic kinship along the maternal lineage between the three old individuals from Costișa and some individuals found in other archaeological sites dated from the Bronze and Iron Age. We also should note that the point mutations analyzed above are also found in Romanian modern population, suggesting that some old individuals from the human populations living on the Romanian land in the Bronze and Iron Age, could participate to a certain extent in the foundation of the Romanian genetic pool."

A major demographic wave occurred after 3000 BC from the steppe, postulated to be linked with the expansion of Indo-European languages. Bronze and Iron Age samples from Hungary, Bulgaria and Romania, however, suggest that this impact was less significant for today's Southeastern Europe than areas north of the Carpathians. In fact, in the abovementioned studies, the Bronze and Iron Age Balkan samples do not cluster with modern Balkan groups, but lie between Sardinians and other southwestern European groups, suggesting later phenomena (i.e. in Antiquity, Great Migration Period) caused shifts in population genetic structure. However, aDNA samples from southeastern Europe remain few, and only further sampling will allow a clear and diachronic overview of migratory and demographic trends.

No detailed analyses exist from the Roman and early medieval periods. Genome-wide analyses of extant populations show that intra-European diversity is a continuum (with the exception of groups like Finns, Sami, Basques and Sardinians). Romanians cluster amidst their Balkan and East European neighbours. However, they generally lie significantly closer to Balkan groups (Bulgarians and Macedonians) than to central and eastern Europeans like Hungarians, Czechs, Poles and Ukrainians, and many lie in the center of the Balkan cluster, near Albanians, Greeks, and Bulgarians, while many former Yugoslav populations like Serbs, Croats, and Slovenes may draw closer to central European West Slavs. On autosomal studies, genetic distance of some Romanian samples to some Italians, such as Tuscans, is greater than that of the distance to neighboring Balkan peoples.

== See also ==
- Ethnogenesis
- Etymology of Romania
- History of Christianity in Romania
- Balkan–Danubian culture
- Bulgarian lands across the Danube

== Sources ==
=== Primary sources ===
- Aeneas Silvius Piccolomini: Europe (c. 1400–1458) (Translated by Robert Brown, introduced and commented by Nancy Bisaha) (2013). The Catholic University of America press. ISBN 978-0-8132-2182-3.
- Anna Comnena: The Alexiad (Translated by E. R. A. Sewter) (1969). Penguin Books. ISBN 978-0-14-044958-7.
- Anonymus, Notary of King Béla: The Deeds of the Hungarians (Edited, Translated and Annotated by Martyn Rady and László Veszprémy) (2010). In: Rady, Martyn; Veszprémy, László; Bak, János M. (2010); Anonymus and Master Roger; CEU Press; ISBN 978-9639776951.
- Aurelius Victor: De Caesaribus (Translated with an introduction and commentary by H. W. Bird) (1994). Liverpool University Press. ISBN 0-85323-218-0.
- Cecaumeno: Consejos de un aristócrata bizantino (Introducción, traducción y notas de Juan Signes Codoñer) [=Kekaumenos: A Byzantine Nobleman's Advice: Introduction, Translation and Notes by Juan Signes Codoñer) (2000). Alianza Editorial. ISBN 84-206-3594-4.
- Constantine Porphyrogenitus: De Administrando Imperio (Greek text edited by Gyula Moravcsik, English translation b Romillyi J. H. Jenkins) (1967). Dumbarton Oaks Center for Byzantine Studies. ISBN 0-88402-021-5.
- Deeds of John and Manuel Comnenus by John Kinnamos (Translated by Charles M. Brand) (1976). Columbia University Press. ISBN 0-231-04080-6.
- Geoffrey of Villehardouin: The Conquest of Constantinople (2008). In: Joinville and Villehardouin: Chronicles of the Crusades (Translated with an Introduction and Notes by Caroline Smith); Penguin Classics; ISBN 978-0-140-44998-3.
- John Skylitzes: A Synopsis of Byzantine History, 811–1057 (Translated by John Wortley with Introductions by Jean-Claude Cheynet and Bernard Flusin and Notes by Jean-Claude Cheynet) (2010). Cambridge University Press. ISBN 978-0-521-76705-7.
- Laonikos Chalkokondyles: Demonstrations of Histories (Books I-III) (A translation with commentary by Nicolaos Nicoloudis) (1996). St. D. Basilopoulos. ISBN 960-7100-97-2.
- Mark of Kalt: The Illuminated Chronicle (Edited, Translated and Annotated by János M. Bak and László Veszprémy) (2018). CEU Press; ISBN 963-3862-65-5.
- O City of Byzantium, Annals of Niketas Choniatēs (Translated by Harry J. Magoulias) (1984). Wayne State University Press. ISBN 978-0-8143-1764-8.
- Paulus Orosius: The Seven Books of History against the Pagans (Translated by Roy J. Deferrari) (1964). The Catholic University of America Press. ISBN 0-8132-1310-X.
- Procopius: History of the Wars (Books VI.16–VII.35.) (With an English Translation by H. B. Dewing) (2006). Harvard University Press. ISBN 0-674-99191-5.
- Royal Frankish Annals (1972). In: Carolingian Chronicles: Royal Frankish Annals and Nithard's Histories (Translated by Bernhard Walter Scholz with Barbara Rogers); The University of Michigan Press; ISBN 0-472-06186-0.
- Simon of Kéza: The Deeds of the Hungarians (Edited and translated by László Veszprémy and Frank Schaer with a study by Jenő Szűcs) (1999). CEU Press. ISBN 963-9116-31-9.
- The Chronicle of Theophanes Confessor: Byzantine and Near Eastern History, AD 284–813 (Translated with Introduction and Commentary by Cyril Mango and Roger Scott with the assistance of Geoffrey Greatrex) (2006). Oxford University Press. ISBN 978-0-19-822568-3.
- The Geography of Ananias of Širak (AŠXARHAC'OYC'): The Long and the Short Recensions (Introduction, Translation and Commentary by Robert H. Hewsen) (1992). Dr. Ludwig Reichert Verlag. ISBN 3-88226-485-3.
- The Gothic History of Jordanes (in English Version with an Introduction and a Commentary by Charles Christopher Mierow, Ph.D., Instructor in Classics in Princeton University) (2006). Evolution Publishing. ISBN 1-889758-77-9.
- The History of Theophylact Simocatta (An English Translation with Introduction and Notes: Michael and Mary Whitby) (1986). Clarendon Press. ISBN 0-19-822799-X.
- The Mission of Friar William of Rubruck: His journey to the court of the Great Khan Möngke, 1253–1255 (Translated by Peter Jackson, Introduction, notes, and appendices by Peter Jackson and David Morgan) (2009). The Hakluyt Society. ISBN 978-0-87220-981-7.
- The Nibelungenlied: The Lay of the Nibelungs (Translated with an Introduction and Notes by Cyril Edwards) (2010). Oxford University Press. ISBN 978-0-19-923854-5.
- The Russian Primary Chronicle: Laurentian Text (Translated and edited by Samuel Hazzard Cross and Olgerd P. Sherbowitz-Wetzor) (1953). Medieval Academy of America. ISBN 978-0-915651-32-0.

=== Secondary sources ===
- Agard, Frederick Browning (1984). A Course in Romance Linguistics Volume 2: A Diachronic View. Georgetown University Press. ISBN 0-87840-074-5.
- Almási, Gábor (2010). "Constructing the Wallach 'other' in the late Renaissance". In Trencsényi, Balázs (ed.). Whose Love of Which Country?. Central European University, Budapest. pp. 107–110. ISBN 978-90-04-18262-2.
- Andreose, Alvise; Renzi, Lorenzo (2013). "Geography and distribution of the Romance languages in Europe". In Maiden, Martin; Smith, John Charles; Ledgeway, Adam (eds.). The Cambridge History of the Romance Languages, Volume II: Contexts. Cambridge University Press. pp. 283–334. ISBN 978-0-521-80073-0.
- Armbruster, Adolf (1972). Romanitatea românilor: Istoria unei idei [The Romanity of the Romanians: The History of an Idea]. Romanian Academy Publishing House.
- Augerot, J. (2009). "Romanian". In Brown, Keith; Ogilvie, Sarah (eds.). Concise Encyclopedia of Languages of the World. Elsevier. pp. 900–904. ISBN 978-0-08-087774-7.
- Barford, P. M. (2001). The Early Slavs: Culture and Society in Early Medieval Eastern Europe. Cornell University Press. ISBN 978-0-8014-3977-3.
- Bargan, Andrea (2015). "The Probable Old Germanic Origin Of Romanian iele '(evil) fairies'". Messages, Sages and Ages. 2 (2): 13–18. doi:10.1515/msas-2015-0007.
- Bartel, Brad (2004). "Acculturation and ethnicity in Roman Moesia Superior". In Champion, T. C. (ed.). Centre and Periphery: Comparative Studies in Archaeology. Routledge. pp. 173–185. ISBN 978-0-415-12253-5.
- Boerescu, Pârvu (2017). Etimologii româneşti controversate: ipoteze şi soluţii (in Romanian). Bucharest: Editura Academiei Române. pp. 326–339. ISBN 978-973-27-2733-1.
- Boia, Lucian (2001). History and Myth in Romanian Consciousness (Translated by James Christian Brown). CEU Press. ISBN 978-963-9116-96-2.
- Boia, Lucian (2004). Romania: Borderland of Europe. Reaktion Books. ISBN 978-1-86189-103-7.
- Bóna, István (1994). "From Dacia to Transylvania: The Period of the Great Migrations (271–895); The Hungarian–Slav Period (895–1172)". In Köpeczi, Béla; Barta, Gábor; Bóna, István; Makkai, László; Szász, Zoltán; Borus, Judit (eds.). History of Transylvania. Akadémiai Kiadó. pp. 62–177. ISBN 978-963-05-6703-9.
- Bossong, Georg (2016). Ledgeway, Adam; Maiden, Martin (eds.). The Oxford Guide of Romance Languages. Oxford: Oxford University Press. p. 64. ISBN 978-0-19-967710-8.
- Bowlus, Charles R. (1994). Franks, Moravians and Magyars: The Struggle for the Middle Danube, 788–907. University of Pennsylvania Press. ISBN 978-0-8122-3276-9.
- Brezeanu, Stelian (1998). "Eastern Romanity in the Millenium of the Great Migrations". In Giurescu, Dinu C.; Fischer-Galați, Stephen (eds.). Romania: A Historic Perspective. Boulder. pp. 45–75. ISBN 0-88033-345-5.
- Cardos, G.; Stoian, V.; Miritoiu, N.; Comsa, A.; Kroll, A.; Voss, S.; Rodewald, A. (2004). "Paleo-mtDNA analysis and population genetic aspects of old Thracian populations from South-East of Romania". Romanian Journal of Legal Medicine. 12 (4): 239–246. ISSN 1221-8618.
- Cinpoes, Radu (2010). Nationalism and identity in Romania: a history of extreme politics from the birth of the state to EU accession. I.B.Tauris. ISBN 978-1-84885-166-5.
- Curta, Florin (2001). The Making of the Slavs: History and Archaeology of the Lower Danube Region, c. 500–700. Cambridge: Cambridge University Press. ISBN 978-1-139-42888-0.
- Curta, Florin (2006). Southeastern Europe in the Middle Ages, 500–1250. Cambridge: Cambridge University Press. ISBN 978-0-521-81539-0.
- Daskalov, Roumen; Vezenkov, Alexander (2015). Entangled Histories of the Balkans – Volume Three: Shared Pasts, Disputed Legacies. Brill. ISBN 978-90-04-29036-5.
- Davis, Sacha (2011). "East–West Discourses in Transylvania: Transitional Erdély, German-Western Siebenbürgen or Latin-Western Ardeal". In Maxwell, Alexander (ed.). The East–West Discourse: Symbolic Geography and its Consequences. Peter Lang AG, International Academic Publishers. pp. 127–154. ISBN 978-3-0343-0198-5.
- Deletant, Dennis (1992). "Ethnos and Mythos in the History of Transylvania: the case of the chronicler Anonymus; The Past in Contemporary Romania: Some Reflections on Recent Romanian Historiography". In Péter, László (ed.). Historians and the History of Transylvania. Boulder. pp. 67–85, 133–158. ISBN 978-0-88033-229-3.
- Demiraj, Shaban (2006). The origin of the Albanians (linguistically investigated). Tirana: Academy of Sciences of Albania. ISBN 978-99943-817-1-5.
- Diez, Friedrich (1836). Grammar of the Romance Languages. Bonn: Eduard Weber. p. 3.
- Dindelegan, Gabriela Pană (2013). "Introduction: Romanian – a brief presentation". In Dindelegan, Gabriela Pană (ed.). The Grammar of Romanian. Oxford University Press. pp. 1–7. ISBN 978-0-19-964492-6.
- Djuvara, Neagu (2016). Thocomerius–Negru Vodă (in Romanian). Humanitas SA. ISBN 978-9-735-05553-0.
- Dutceac Segesten, Anamaria (2011). Myth, Identity, and Conflict: A Comparative Analysis of Romanian and Serbian History Textbooks. Lexington Books. ISBN 978-0-7391-4865-5.
- Ellis, L. (1998). Shennan, Stephen (ed.). "Terra deserta: population, politics, and the [de]colonization of Dacia". World Archaeology. Population and Demography. 30 (2). Routledge: 220–237. doi:10.1080/00438243.1998.9980408. ISSN 0043-8243.
- Engel, Pál (2001). The Realm of St Stephen: A History of Medieval Hungary, 895–1526. I.B. Tauris Publishers. ISBN 978-1-86064-061-2.
- Felecan, Oliviu; Felecan, Nicolae (2015). "Etymological strata reflected in Romanian hydronymy". Quaderns de Filología. Estudis Lingüístics. 20 (Toponímia Románica): 251–269. doi:10.7203/qfilologia.20.7521. hdl:10550/49693. ISSN 1135-416X.
- Fiedler, Uwe (2008). "Bulgars in the Lower Danube region: A survey of the archaeological evidence and of the state of current research". In Curta, Florin; Kovalev, Roman (eds.). The Other Europe in the Middle Ages: Avars, Bulgars, Khazars, and Cumans. Brill. pp. 151–236. ISBN 978-90-04-16389-8.
- Fine, John V. A (1991). The Early Medieval Balkans: A Critical Survey from the Sixth to the Late Twelfth century. The University of Michigan Press. ISBN 978-0-472-08149-3.
- Fortson, Benjamin W. (2004). Indo-European Language and Culture: An Introduction. Blackwell Publishing. ISBN 978-1-4051-0316-9.
- Fyodorov, Georgy B. (1999). "Ethnogenesis of the Vlachs, Moldovans' Ancestors, According to the Archaeological Data (Historiographical Aspect)". Stratum Plus. Archaeology and Cultural Anthropology (5 ed.).
- Georgescu, Vlad (1991). The Romanians: A History. Ohio State University Press. ISBN 978-0-8142-0511-2.
- Georgiev, Vladimir (July 1966). "The Genesis of the Balkan Peoples". The Slavonic and East European Review. 44 (103): 285–297.
- Goga, Ecaterina (1980). Introducere in filologia romanică. Editura Didactică şi Pedagogică București.
- Grecescu, Constantin; Simonescu, Dan (1960). Istoria Țării Românești: 1290-1690: Letopisețul cantacuzinesc (PDF) (in Romanian). Vol. 3. Editura Academiei Republicii Populare Române. p. 4.
- Grecu, Vasile (1958). Expuneri istorice: creșterea puterii turcești, căderea împărăției bizantine și alte istorii despre felurite țări și popoare (PDF). Academia Republicii Populare România; Institutul de Studii Sud-Est Europene.
- Haarmann, Harald (1976). Niederehe, Hans-Joseph; Haarmann, John Benjamin (eds.). In Memoriam Friedrich Diez. Amsterdam: John Benjamin. p. 238. ISBN 90-272-0891-3.
- Hall, Robert A. Jr. (1950). "The Reconstruction of Proto-Romance". Language. 26 (1). Linguistic Society of America: 6–27. doi:10.2307/410406. JSTOR 410406.
- Hammarström, Harald; Forkel, Robert; Haspelmath, Martin (2019). "Catalogue of languages and families". Jena: Max Planck Institute for the Science of Human History. Archived from the original on May 2, 2020.
- Hamp, Eric P. (1980). "Thracian, Dacian and Albanian–Romanian Correspondences". Actes du IIe Congrès international de thracologie: Linguistique, ethnologie (ethnographie, folkloristique et art populaire), anthropologie. Editura Academiei Republicii Socialiste România. pp. 57–60.
- Heather, Peter; Matthews, John (1991). The Goths in the Fourth Century (Translated Texts for Historians, Volume 11). Liverpool University Press. ISBN 978-0-85323-426-5.
- Heather, Peter (1998). The Goths. Blackwell Publishing. ISBN 978-0-6312-0932-4.
- Hitchins, Keith (2014). A Concise History of Romania. Cambridge University Press. ISBN 978-0-521-69413-1.
- Illyés, Elemér (1992). Ethnic continuity in the Carpatho-Danubian area (2nd ed.). Hamilton: Struktura Press. ISBN 0-88033-146-1.
- Ismajli, Rexhep (2015). Eqrem Basha (ed.). Studime për historinë e shqipes në kontekst ballkanik [Studies on the History of Albanian in the Balkan context] (PDF) (in Albanian). Prishtinë: Kosova Academy of Sciences and Arts, special editions CLII, Section of Linguistics and Literature. Archived (PDF) from the original on February 24, 2022.
- Izzo, Herbert J. (1986). "On the history of Romanian". In Marino, Mary C.; Pérez, Luis A. (eds.). The Twelfth LACUS Forum, 1985. Linguistic Association of Canada and the United States. pp. 139–146.
- Holban, Maria (2000). Călători străini despre Ţările Române. Volumul X, Partea 1 [Foreign Travellers about the Romanian Lands, Volum X, Part I]. Editura Academiei Romane. ISBN 978-973-27-0699-2.
- Kiss, Lajos (1997). "Erdély vízneveinek rétegződése [The layers of the river names in Transylvania]". In Kovács, László; Veszprémy, László (eds.). Honfoglalás és nyelvészet [The "Conquest of Our County" and Linguistics]. Balassi Kiadó. pp. 199–210. ISBN 963-506-108-0.
- Kopecký, Peter (2004–2005). "Caractéristique lexicale de l'élément slave dans le vocabulaire roumain: Confrontation historique aux sédiments lexicaux turcs et grecs [Lexical characteristics of the Slavic elements of the Romanians language: A historical comparison with the Turkic and Greek lexical layers]". Ianua: Revista Philologica Romanica. 5: 43–53. ISSN 1616-413X.
- Kortlandt, Frederik (2003). "The Thraco-Armenian consonant shift". In Beekes, Robert S. P. (ed.). Armeniaca: Comparative Notes. Caravan Books. ISBN 978-0-88206-106-1.
- Kristó, Gyula (1996). Hungarian History in the Ninth Century. Szegedi Középkorász Muhely. ISBN 978-963-482-113-7.
- Kristó, Gyula (2003). Early Transylvania (895-1324). Lucidus Kiadó. ISBN 978-963-9465-12-1.
- Lockyear, Kris (2004). "The Late Iron Age background to Roman Dacia". In Haynes, I. P.; Hanson, W. S. (eds.). Roman Dacia: The Making of a Provincial Society (Journal of Roman Archaeology Supplementary Series, Number 56). Journal of Roman Archaeology, L.L.C. pp. 33–74. ISBN 978-1-887829-56-4.
- Kwan, Jonathan (2005). "Nation-States and Irredentism in the Balkans". In Trencsényi, Balázs (ed.). Statehood Before and Beyond Ethnicity: Minor States in Northern and Eastern Europe, 1600–2000. European Interuniversity Press. pp. 275–302. ISBN 978-90-5201-291-9.
- Macartney, C. A. (1953). The Medieval Hungarian Historians: A Critical & Analytical Guide. Cambridge University Press. ISBN 978-0-521-08051-4.
- Madgearu, Alexandru (1997). Continuitate şi discontinuitate culturală la Dunărea de Jos în secolele VII-VIII [Cultural Continuity and Discontinuity along the Lower Danube in the 7th-8th Centuries]. Editura Universității din București. ISBN 978-973-575-180-7.
- Madgearu, Alexandru (2004). "The Spreading of Christianity in the rural areas of post-Roman Dacia (4th–7th centuries)". Archaevs. VIII: 41–59. ISSN 1453-5165.
- Madgearu, Alexandru (2005a). The Romanians in the Anonymous Gesta Hungarorum: Truth and Fiction. Romanian Cultural Institute, Center for Transylvanian Studies. ISBN 978-973-7784-01-8.
- Madgearu, Alexandru (2005b). "Salt Trade and Warfare: The Rise of Romanian-Slavic Military Organization in Early Medieval Transylvania". In Curta, Florin (ed.). East Central & Eastern Europe in the Early Middle Ages. The University of Michigan Press. pp. 103–120. ISBN 978-0-472-11498-6.
- Madgearu, Alexandru (2017). The Asanids: The Political and Military History of the Second Bulgarian Empire, 1185–1280. BRILL. ISBN 978-9-004-32501-2.
- Madgearu, Alexandru (2018). Grupo de Investigación CAPIRE (ed.). "The Mongol domination and the detachment of the Romanians of Wallachia from the domination of the Hungarian Kingdom". De Medio Aevo. Madrid. eISSN 2255-5889.
- Madgearu, Alexandru (2019). Expansiunea maghiară în Transilvania [Hungarian expansion in Transylvania] (in Romanian). Editura Cetatea de Scaun. ISBN 978-606-5374-77-5.
- Maenchen-Helfen, Otto J. (1973). The World of the Huns: Studies in Their History and Culture (Edited by Max Knight). University of California Press. ISBN 978-0-520-01596-8.
- Maiden, Martin (2016). "Romanian, Istro–Romanian, Megleno–Romanian, and Arumanian". In Ledgeway, Adam; Maiden, Martin (eds.). The Oxford Guide to the Romance Languages. Oxford University Press. pp. 91–125. ISBN 978-0-19-967710-8.
- Makkai, László (1994). "The Emergence of the Estates (1172–1526)". In Köpeczi, Béla; Barta, Gábor; Bóna, István; Makkai, László; Szász, Zoltán; Borus, Judit (eds.). History of Transylvania. Akadémiai Kiadó. pp. 178–243. ISBN 978-963-05-6703-9.
- Malcolm, Noel (1998). Kosovo: A Short History. ISBN 978-0-3304-1224-7.
- Mallinson, Graham (1988). "Rumanian". In Harris, Martin; Vincent, Nigel (eds.). The Romance Languages. Oxford University Press. pp. 391–419. ISBN 978-0-19-520829-0.
- Matzinger, Joachim (2012). "Herkunft des Albanischen: Argumente gegen die thrakische Hypothese" [Origin of Albanian: Arguments Against the Thracian Hypothesis]. In Rugova, Bardh (ed.). Studime për nder të Rexhep Ismajlit: me rastin e 65vjetorit të lindjes. Koha. pp. 635–649. ISBN 978-9951-417-76-1.
- Mihăescu, H. (1993). La Romanité dans le Sud-Est de L'Europe [=The Romans in South-Eastern Europe] (in French). Editura Academiei Române. ISBN 97-3270-342-3.
- Miskolczy, Ambrus (2021). A román középkor időszerű kérdései (in Hungarian). Budapest: Institute of Hungarian Research. ISBN 978-615-6117-41-0. ISSN 2677-0261.
- Mišeska Tomić, Olga (2006). Balkan Sprachbund Morpho-Syntactic Features. Springer. ISBN 978-1-4020-4487-8.
- Mócsy, András (1974). Pannonia and Upper Moesia: A History of the Middle Danube Provinces of the Roman Empire. Routledge & Kegan Paul. ISBN 978-0-7100-7714-1.
- Musset, Lucien (1965). Les invasions. Le second assaut contre l'Europe chrétienne (VIIe-XI siècles). Presses Univ. France.
- Rásonyi, László (1979). "Bulaqs and Oguzs in Medieval Transylvania" (PDF). Acta Orientalia (in Hungarian). 33. Akadémiai Kiadó. ISSN 0001-6446. Archived (PDF) from the original on November 23, 2022.
- Nägler, Thomas (2005). "Transylvania between 900 and 1300". In Pop, Ioan-Aurel; Nägler, Thomas (eds.). The History of Transylvania, Vol. I. (Until 1541). Romanian Cultural Institute (Center for Transylvanian Studies). pp. 198–231. ISBN 978-973-7784-00-1.
- Nandris, Grigore (December 1951). "The Development and Structure of Rumanian". The Slavonic and East European Review. 30 (74): 7–39.
- Nicoloudis, Nicolaos (1996). Historical Publications St. D. Basilopoulos (ed.). Laonikos Chalkokondyles: A Translation and Commentary of the "Demonstrations of Histories", Books I-III. Historical Publications St. D. Basilopoulos. ISBN 978-960-7100-97-9.
- Niculescu, Gheorghe Alexandru (2007). "Archaeology and Nationalism in The History of the Romanians". In Kohl, Philip L.; Kozelsky, Mara; Ben-Yehuda, Nachman (eds.). Selective Remembrances: Archaeology in the Construction, Commemoration, and Consecration of National Pasts. The University of Chicago Press. pp. 127–159. ISBN 978-0-226-45058-2.
- Oltean, Ioana A. (2007). Dacia: Landscape, Colonisation and Romanization. Routledge. ISBN 978-0-415-41252-0.
- Opreanu, Coriolan Horaţiu (2005). "The North-Danube Regions from the Roman Province of Dacia to the Emergence of the Romanian Language (2nd–8th Centuries AD)". In Pop, Ioan-Aurel; Bolovan, Ioan (eds.). History of Romania: Compendium. Romanian Cultural Institute (Center for Transylvanian Studies). pp. 59–132. ISBN 978-973-7784-12-4.
- Orel, Vladimir (1998). Albanian Etymological Dictionary. BRILL. ISBN 978-90-04-11024-3.
- Pană Dindelegan, Gabriela (2013). "Introduction: Romanian – a brief presentation". In Pană Dindelegan, Gabriela (ed.). The Grammar of Romanian. Oxford University Press. pp. 1–7. ISBN 978-0-19-964492-6.
- Pei, Mario (1976). The Story of Latin and the Romance Languages. Harper & Row, Publishers. ISBN 00-6013-312-0.
- Petrucci, Peter R. (1999). Slavic Features in the History of Rumanian. LINCOM EUROPA. ISBN 978-3-89586-599-2.
- Petrukhin, Vladimir; Rayevsky, Dmitry (2004). Очерки истории народов России в древности и раннем средневековье: учеб. пособие для гуманит [Essays on the History of the Peoples of Russia in Antiquity and Early Middle Ages] (in Russian). Moscow. ISBN 5-7859-0057-2.
- Pohl, Walter (1998). "Conceptions of Ethnicity in Early Medieval Studies". In Little, Lester K.; Rosenwein, Barbara (eds.). Debating the Middle Ages: Issues and Readings. Blackwell Publishers. pp. 15–24. ISBN 978-1577-18008-1.
- Pohl, Walter (2013). "National Origin Narratives in the Austro-Hungarian Monarchy". In Geary, Patrick J.; Klaniczay, Gábor (eds.). Manufacturing Middle Ages: Entangled History of Medievalism in Nineteenth-Century Europe. BRILL. pp. 13–50. ISBN 978-90-04-24486-3.
- Pohl, Walter (2018). The Avars: A Steppe Empire in Central Europe, 567-822. Cornell University Press. ISBN 978-0-80-144210-0.
- Pop, Ioan-Aurel (1994). "Observații privitoare la structura etnică și confesională a Ungariei și Transilvaniei medievale : (secolele IX-XIV)" (PDF). In Berindei, Dan (ed.). Istoria României. Pagini transilvane (in Romanian). Fundația Culturală Româna. ISBN 978-9-73-913273-2.
- Pop, Ioan-Aurel (1999). Romanians and Romania: A Brief History. Boulder. ISBN 978-0-88033-440-2.
- Pop, Ioan Aurel (2013). "De Manibus Valachorum Scismaticorum...": Romanians and Power in the Mediaeval Kingdom of Hungary. Peter Land Edition. ISBN 978-3-631-64866-7.
- Pop, Ioan-Aurel (2018). Marea Istorie ilustrată a României și a Republicii Moldova. Grup Editorial Litera. ISBN 978-6-06-335847-0.
- Poruciuc, Adrian (September 25, 2015). "Clues to the chronology of Old Germanic loans in Romanian and in other South-East European languages". Slavia Meridionalis. 15: 14–31. doi:10.11649/sm.2015.003. ISSN 2392-2400.
- Posner, Rebecca (1996). The Romance Languages. Cambridge University Press. ISBN 978-0-52-128139-3.
- Prodan, D. (1971). Supplex Libellus Valachorum or The Political Struggle of the Romanians in Transylvania during the 18th Century. Publishing House of the Academy of the Socialist Republic of Romania.
- Ruscu, Dan (2004). "The supposed extermination of the Dacians: the literary tradition". In Haynes, I. P.; Hanson, W. S. (eds.). Roman Dacia: The Making of a Provincial Society (Journal of Roman Archaeology Supplementary Series, Number 56). Journal of Roman Archaeology, L.L.C. pp. 75–85. ISBN 978-1-887829-56-4.
- Rustoiu, Aurel (2005). "Dacia before the Romans". In Pop, Ioan-Aurel; Bolovan, Ioan (eds.). History of Romania: Compendium. Romanian Cultural Institute (Center for Transylvanian Studies). pp. 31–58. ISBN 978-973-7784-12-4.
- Rusu, Ioan Iosif (1990). Opriș, Ioan (ed.). Românii și Secuii (in Romanian). Bucharest: Editura Științifică.
- Sala, Marius (2005). From Latin to Romanian: The Historical Development of Romanian in a Comparative Romance Context. University, Mississippi. ISBN 1-889441-12-0.
- Sălăgean, Tudor (2004). "Ardealul timpuriu (895-1324)". medievistica.ro (in Romanian). Szeged. Archived from the original on January 18, 2022.
- Sălăgean, Tudor (2005). "Romanian Society in the Early Middle Ages (9th–14th Centuries AD)". In Pop, Ioan-Aurel; Bolovan, Ioan (eds.). History of Romania: Compendium. Romanian Cultural Institute (Center for Transylvanian Studies). pp. 133–207. ISBN 978-973-7784-12-4.
- Saramandu, Nicolae (2008). "Originea românei și a dialectelor sale (observații critice pe marginea unor lucrări recente)" (in Romanian) (Philologica Jassyensia, IV (2) ed.). Iași: Institutul de Filologie Română "A. Philippide".
- Schramm, Gottfried (1997). Ein Damm bricht. Die römische Donaugrenze und die Invasionen des 5-7. Jahrhunderts in Lichte der Namen und Wörter [=A Dam Breaks: The Roman Danube frontier and the Invasions of the 5th-7th Centuries in the Light of Names and Words] (in German). R. Oldenbourg Verlag. ISBN 978-3-486-56262-0.
- Schramm, Gottfried; von Puttkamer, Joachim; Arens, Meinolf (2002). "Hogyan kerültek a románok többségbe jelenlegi államuk területén?" [How did the Romanians became majority in Romania?] (PDF). Történelmi Szemle (in Hungarian). 44. Virgil Ciocîltan, Zoltán Szász, Daniel Bein, Thede Kahl, Hansgerd Göckenjan, Wolfgang Dahmen, Hans-Martin Gauger, Johannes Kramer. Archived (PDF) from the original on September 24, 2022.
- Schulte, Kim (2009). "Loanwords in Romanian". In Haspelmath, Martin; Tadmor, Uri (eds.). Loanwords in the World's Languages: A Comparative Handbook. De Gruyter Mouton. pp. 230–259. ISBN 978-3-11-021843-5.
- Sófalvi, András (2012). A székelység szerepe a középkori és fejedelemség kori határvédelemben [The role of the Székely people in Medieval and Principality-era border defense] (in Hungarian). Cluj Napoca: Erdélyi Múzeum-Egyesület.
- Spinei, Victor (1986). Moldavia in the 11th–14th Centuries. Editura Academiei Republicii Socialiste Româna.
- Spinei, Victor (2009). The Romanians and the Turkic Nomads North of the Danube Delta from the Tenth to the Mid-Thirteenth century. Koninklijke Brill NV. ISBN 978-90-04-17536-5.
- Stephenson, Paul (2000). Byzantium's Balkan Frontier: A Political Study of the Northern Balkans, 900–1204. Cambridge University Press. ISBN 978-0-521-02756-4.
- Szabó T., Attila (1985). "Hungarian Loanwords of Romanian Origin" (PDF). Hungarian Studies. 1 (1): 51–65. ISSN 0236-6568.
- Taylor, Timothy (2001). "Thracians, Scythians, and Dacians". In Cunliffe, Barry (ed.). The Oxford Illustrated History of Prehistoric Europe. Oxford University Press. pp. 373–410. ISBN 978-0-19-285441-4.
- Todd, Malcolm (2003). The Early Germans. Blackwell Publishing Ltd. ISBN 978-0-631-16397-8.
- Tomescu, Domnița (April 7, 2009). Romanische Sprachgeschichte / Histoire linguistique de la Romania. 3. Teilband. Walter de Gruyter. pp. 1–3464. ISBN 978-3-11-021141-2.
- Tóth, Endre (1994). "The Roman Province of Dacia". In Köpeczi, Béla; Barta, Gábor; Bóna, István; Makkai, László; Szász, Zoltán; Borus, Judit (eds.). History of Transylvania. Akadémiai Kiadó. pp. 28–61. ISBN 978-963-05-6703-9.
- Treadgold, Warren (1997). A History of the Byzantine State and Society. Stanford University Press. ISBN 978-0-8047-2630-6.
- Vásáry, István (2005). Cumans and Tatars: Oriental Military in the Pre-Ottoman Balkans, 1185–1365. Cambridge University Press. ISBN 978-0-521-83756-9.
- Vékony, Gábor (2000). Dacians, Romans, Romanians. Matthias Corvinus Publishing. ISBN 978-1-882785-13-1.
- Vermeer, Willem (1996). "Linguistics and Politics: The origin of the Albanian language". In Gerlachlus Duijzings; Dušan Janjić; Shkëlzen Maliqi (eds.). Kosovo - Kosova: Confrontation Or Coexistence. Nijmegen: Peace Research Centre, University of Nijmegen. pp. 123–132. ISBN 978-90-71701-64-1.
- Wexler, Paul (1997). "The case for the relexification hypothesis in Rumanian". In Horváth, Júlia; Wexler, Paul (eds.). Relexification in Creole and Non-Creole Languages: With special attention to Haitian Creole, Modern Hebrew, Romani, and Rumanian. Harrassowith Verlag. pp. 162–188. ISBN 978-3-447-03954-3.
- Wilkes, John (1992). The Illyrians. Wiley. ISBN 978-0-631-19807-9.
- Wolfram, Herwig (1988). The Roman Empire and Its Germanic Peoples. University of California Press. ISBN 978-0-520-08511-4.
