= Șugag (river) =

- Location within Romania

Location
- Country: Romania
- Counties: Sibiu County

Physical characteristics
- Mouth: Dobra
  - coordinates: 45.7441°N 23.6776°E
- Length: 11 km (6.8 mi)
- Basin size: 22 km^{2} (8.5 sq mi)

Basin features
- Progression: Dobra→ Sebeș→ Mureș→ Tisza→ Danube→ Black Sea
- Tributaries
  - right: Mocirlele

The Șugag is a left tributary of the river Dobra in Romania. It flows into the Dobra near Jina. Its length is 11 km (6.8 mi) and its basin size is 22 km^{2} (8.5 sq mi).
