= Tonea =

Tonea may refer to:

== Places ==
- Tonea, a village in Săsciori Commune, Alba County, Romania
- Tonea, a village in Modelu Commune, Călărași County, Romania

== People ==
- Tonea Marshall (born 1998), American hurdler
- Tonea Stewart (born 1947), American actress
