= Prigoana =

- Location within Romania

Location
- Country: Romania
- Counties: Alba County

Physical characteristics
- Source: Șureanu Mountains
  - coordinates: 45°33′56″N 23°32′04″E
  - elevation: 1,703 m (5,587 ft)
- Mouth: Sebeș
  - coordinates: 45°36′38″N 23°38′15″E
  - elevation: 1,128 m (3,701 ft)
- Length: 11 km (6.8 mi)
- Basin size: 30 km^{2} (12 sq mi)

Basin features
- Progression: Sebeș→ Mureș→ Tisza→ Danube→ Black Sea

The Prigoana is a left tributary of the river Sebeș in Romania. It discharges into the Sebeș downstream of the Oașa Dam. Its length is 11 km (6.8 mi) and its basin size is 30 km^{2} (12 sq mi).
