= Dobra (Sebeș) =

- Location within Romania

Location
- Country: Romania
- Counties: Sibiu County, Alba County

Physical characteristics
- Mouth: Sebeș
  - location: Dobra
  - coordinates: 45.7683°N 23.6383°E
- Length: 22 km (14 mi)
- Basin size: 85 km^{2} (33 sq mi)

Basin features
- Progression: Sebeș→ Mureș→ Tisza→ Danube→ Black Sea
- Tributaries
  - left: Pogoana, Șugag

The Dobra is a right tributary of the river Sebeș in Romania. It discharges into the Sebeș in the village Dobra. Its length is 22 km (14 mi) and its basin size is 85 km^{2} (33 sq mi).
