= Curpăt =

- Location within Romania

Location
- Country: Romania
- Counties: Sibiu County

Physical characteristics
- Source: Cindrel Mountains
- Mouth: Sebeș
  - coordinates: 45°32′24″N 23°38′14″E
  - elevation: 1,256 m (4,121 ft)
- Length: 9 km (5.6 mi)
- Basin size: 23 km^{2} (8.9 sq mi)

Basin features
- Progression: Sebeș→ Mureș→ Tisza→ Danube→ Black Sea
- Tributaries
  - right: Curpătul Mic

The Curpăt is a right tributary of the river Sebeș in Romania. It flows into the Sebeș upstream from the Oașa Dam. Its length is 9 km (5.6 mi) and its basin size is 23 km^{2} (8.9 sq mi).
