= Dacian fortress of Căpâlna =

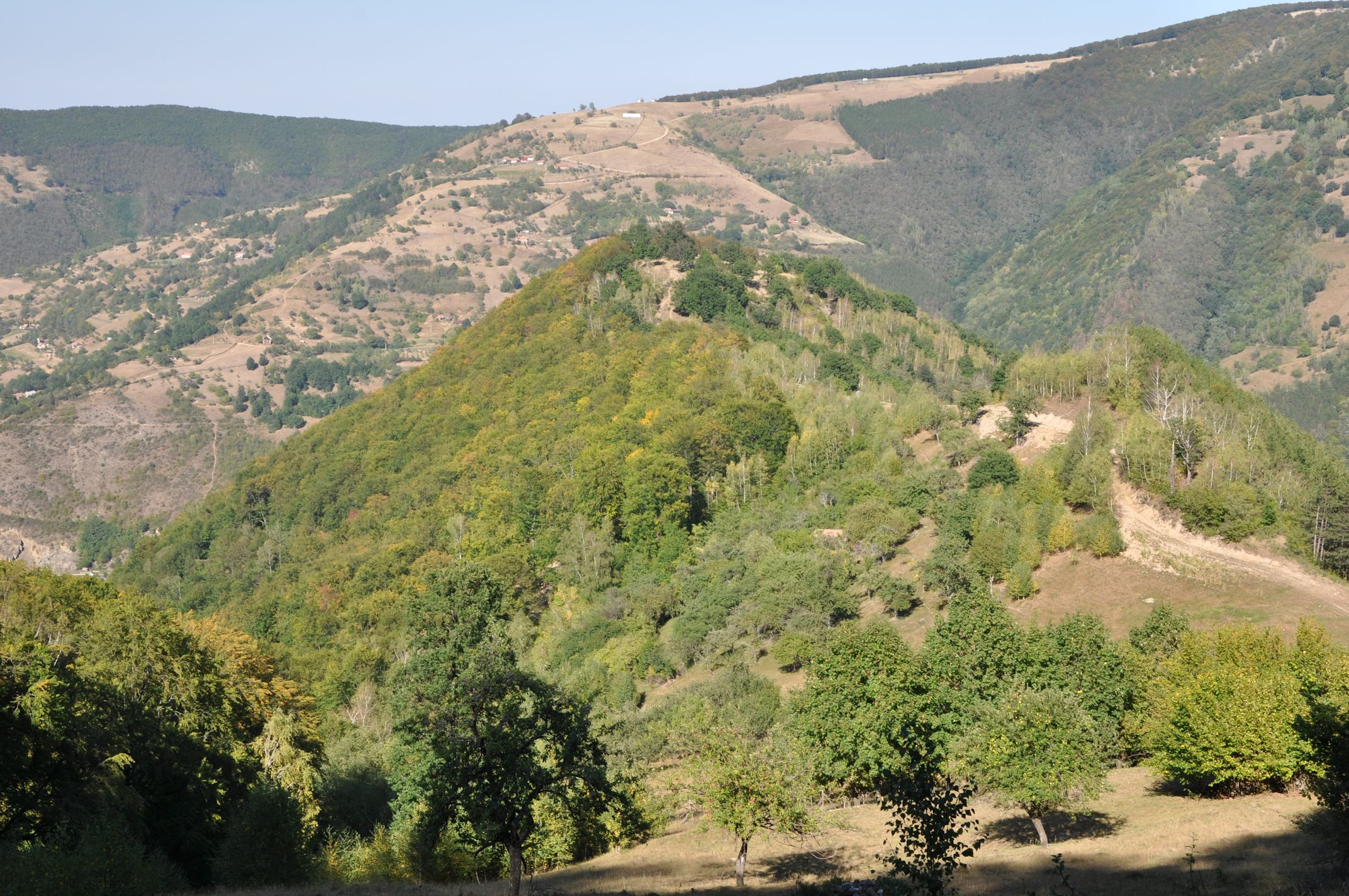
- Panoramic view from south-west of fortress hill

- Location within Romania
- 45.822257°N 23.603470°E
- Location: Dealul Gărgălău, Căpâlna, Alba, Romania

History
- Built: c. 50 BC
- Abandoned: 106 AD
- Event: Trajan's Dacian Wars

Site notes
- Elevation: 650 m (2,130 ft)
- Excavation dates: 1982 - 1983
- Archaeologists: Mihail Macrea; Ion Berciu; Ioan Glodariu
- Condition: Ruined

Monument istoric
- Reference no.: AB-I-s-A-00020

UNESCO World Heritage Site
- Part of: Dacian Fortresses of the Orăștie Mountains
- Criteria: Cultural: (ii), (iii), (iv)
- Reference: 906
- Inscription: 1999 (23rd Session)

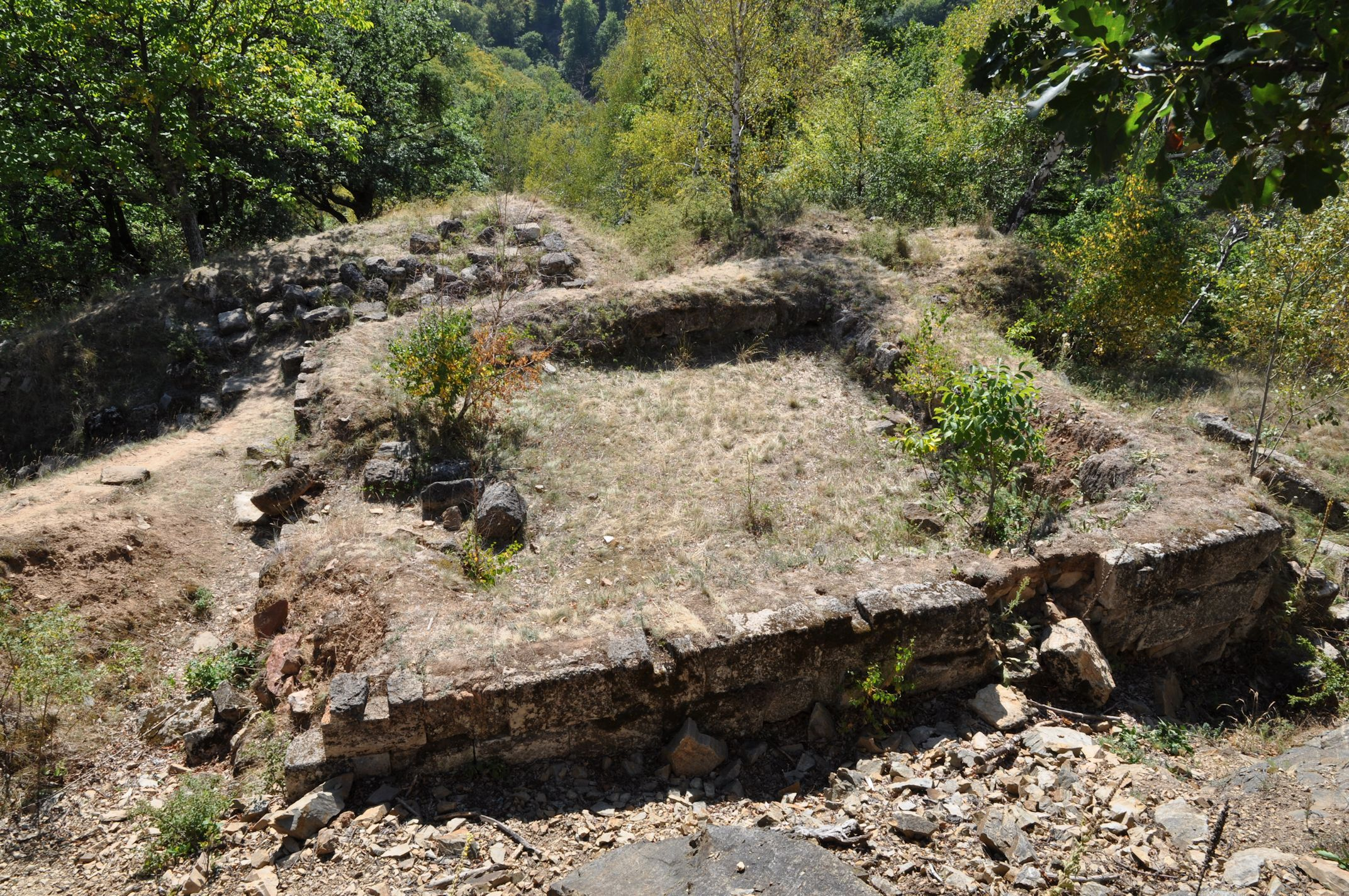
Tower house (9.5 m x 9.5 m) built with limestone blocks

Situated at the top of a steep hill, the Dacian fortress of Căpâlna was built in the second half of the 1st century BC as a military defense, guarding the entrance from the Sebeș Valley to the capital of the Dacian kingdom, Sarmizegetusa Regia.

It is supposed that the fortress was the residence of a Dacian chieftain. Archeological findings include ceramics, iron and bronze tools, silver and bronze jewellery and Roman coins from the Republican and Imperial periods. Around 2002 - 2003 a gold necklace and two gold earrings were discovered here.

The fortress was witness to Dacian - Roman battles during Trajan's Dacian Wars. In the first war, the fort was occupied by the Romans. Ultimately, it was burnt and destroyed by the Romans around 106 AD.

The fortress is encircled by an elliptical wall (c. 270 m long). The wall was partially destroyed during the first war, and was hastily rebuilt just before the second war.

Inside two terraces were found. On the higher level terrace, at the highest point, an observatory tower existed.

A tower house (9.5 m x 9.5 m) was positioned strategically near the main fortified gate. A second gate positioned through the Sebeș Valley was blocked after the first war, sometime after 102 AD. The fort follows the architectural principles of the Dacian Fortresses of the Orăștie Mountains; the wall being the typical murus Dacicus. Outside the fortification three defensive ditches were found.

During excavations from 1982 - 1983, Dacian sanctuary ruins were found.

The site was listed as a UNESCO World Heritage Site in 1999.

== Tourism ==
Near the bridge from Căpâlna, a sign indicates the road to the fortress.

The site can be reached by walking around 2 kilometres on a steep gravel road starting from the main road (DN67C) situated at the bottom of valley.

== Gallery ==
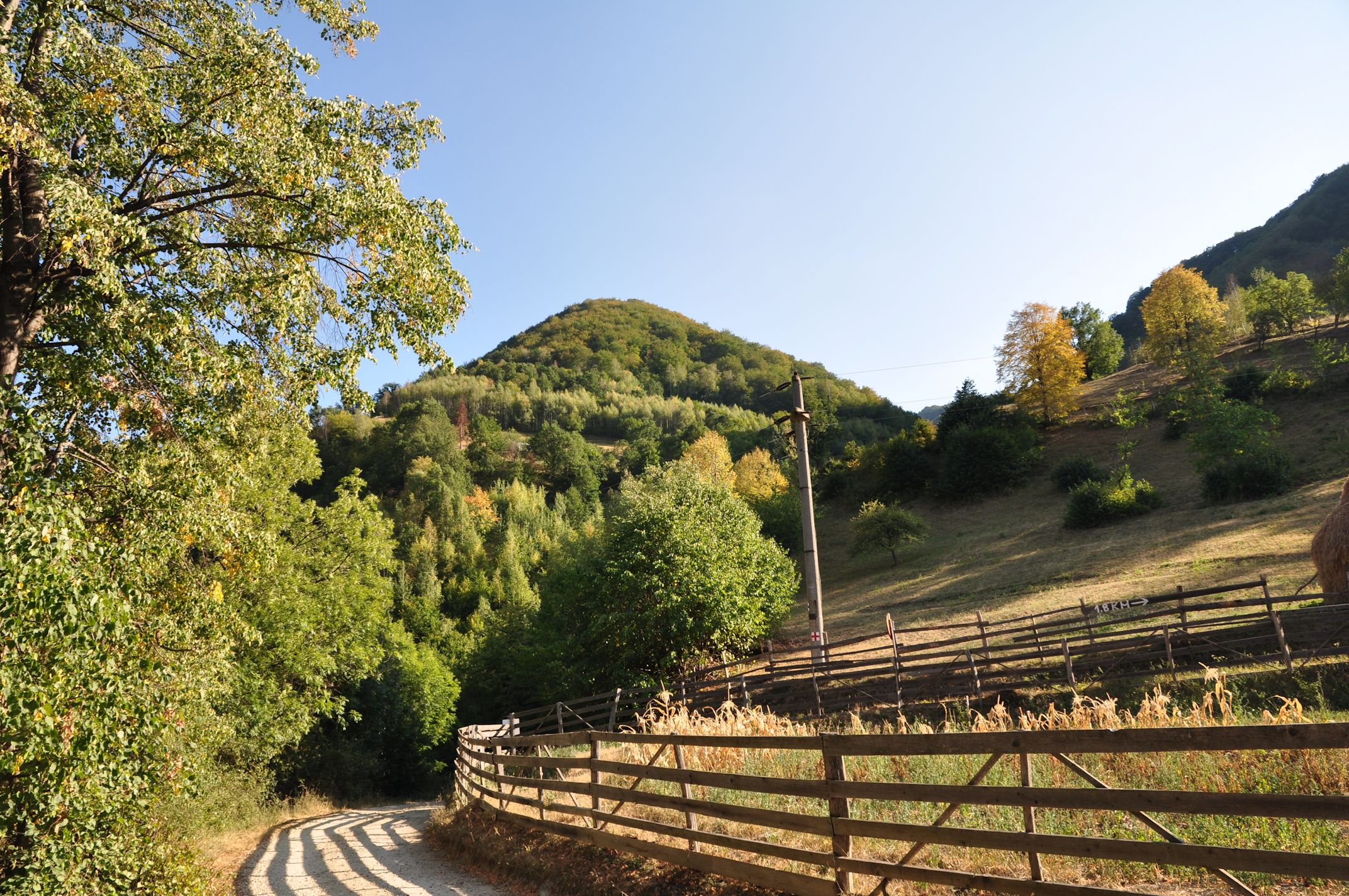
View from the base, near the river

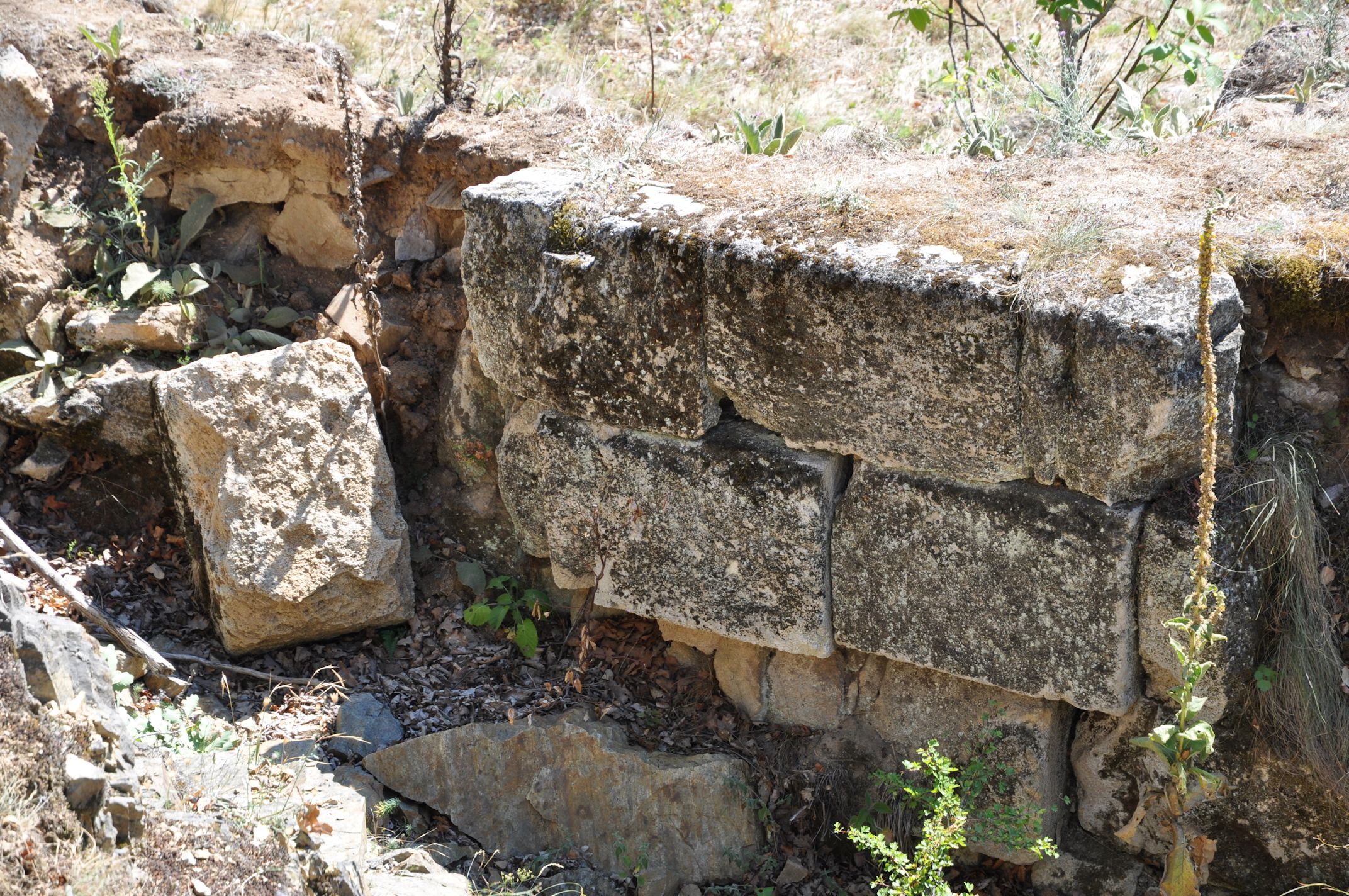
Stone block of dwelling tower

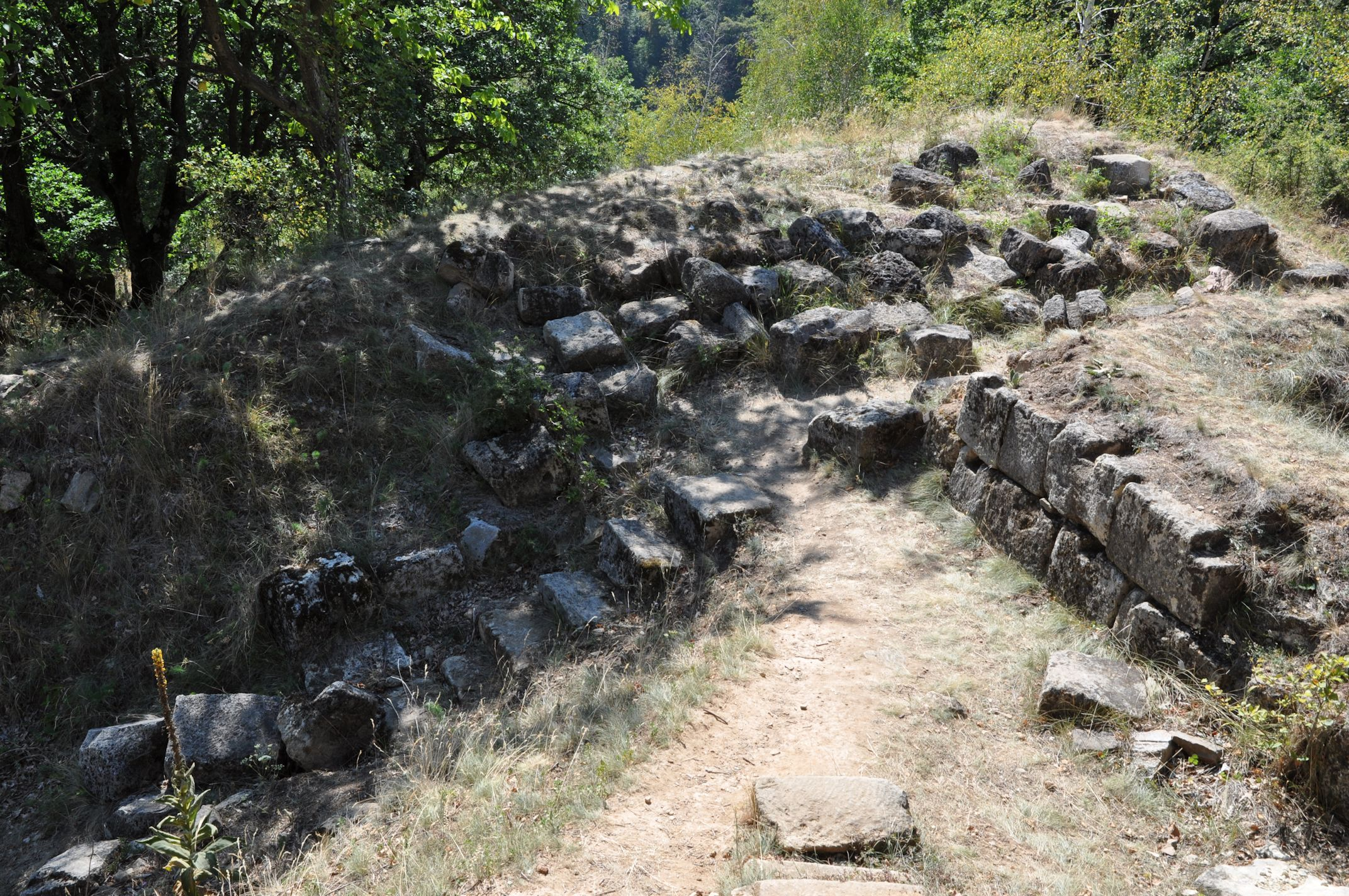
South-west side of the fortress

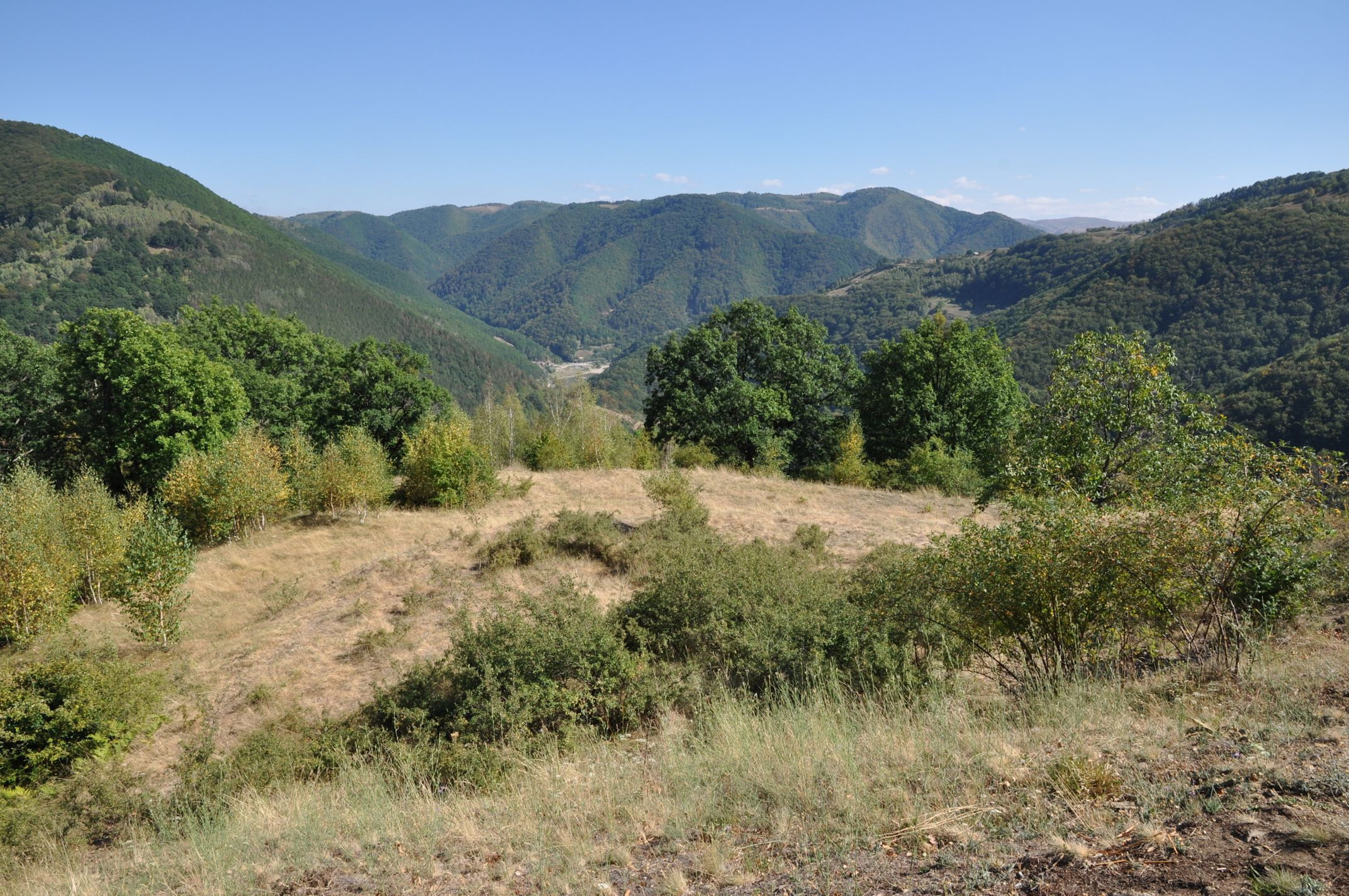
Landscape to the south-east

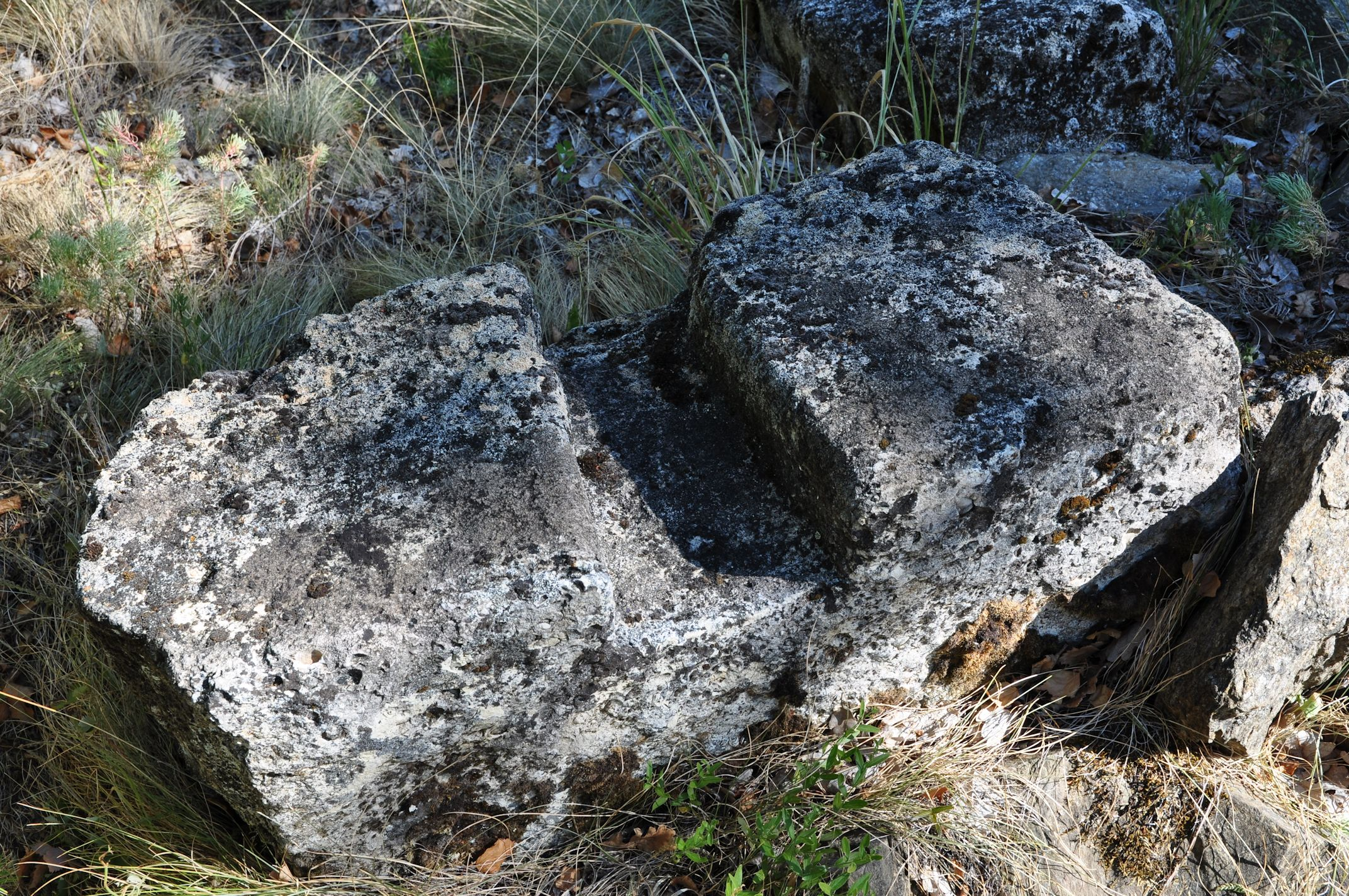
Murus Dacicus stone block

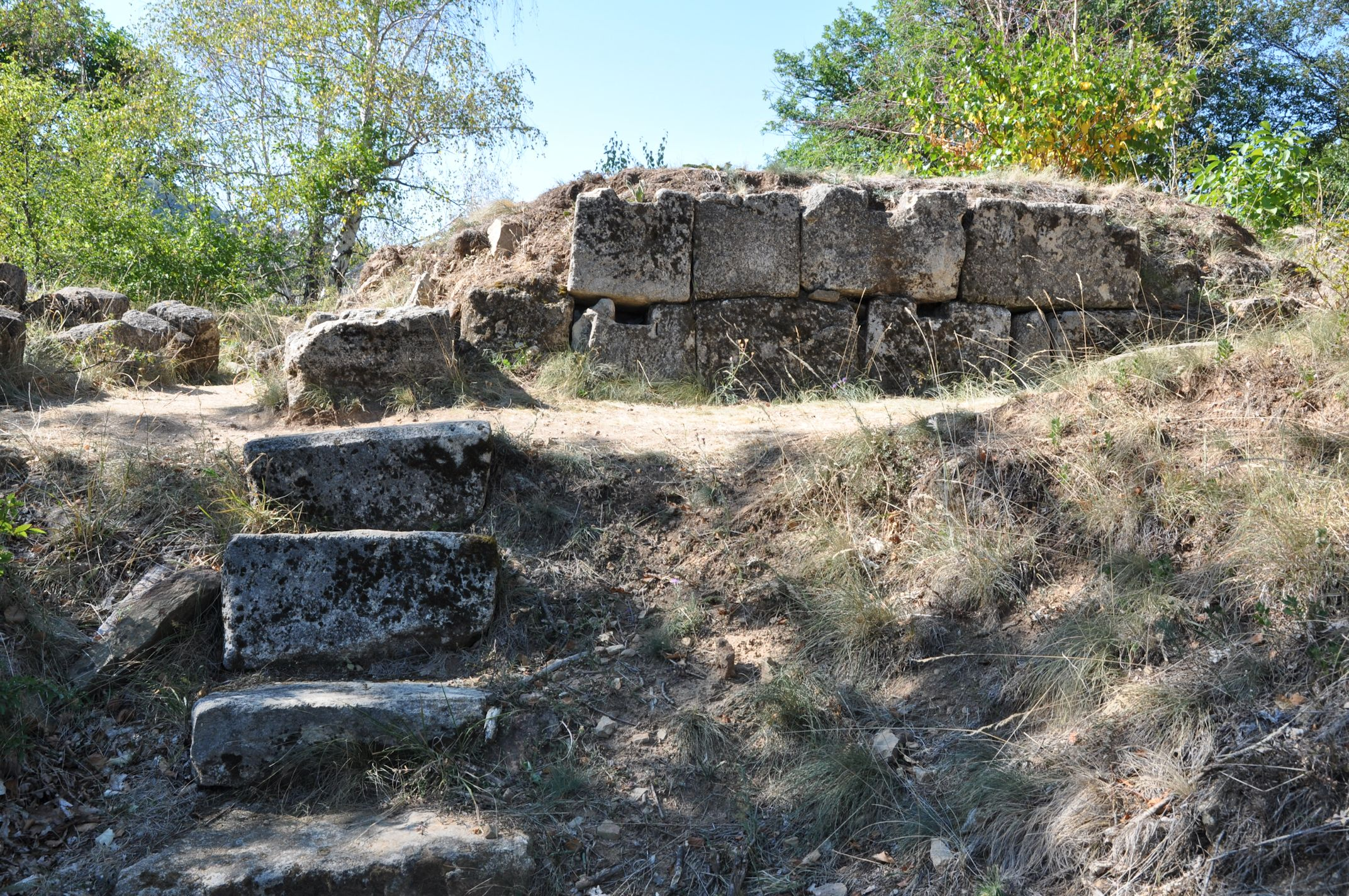
Near the main gate
