= Sebeshely =

Sebeshely is the Hungarian name for two villages in Romania:

- Sebeşel village, Săsciori Commune, Alba County
- Sibişel village, Râu de Mori Commune, Hunedoara County
