= Marginea River =

Marginea River may refer to:

- Marginea, a tributary of the Ciban in Sibiu County
- Marginea, a tributary of the Topolog in Vâlcea County

== See also ==
- Marginea Domnească River
- Marginea
