= Sălanele =

- Location within Romania

Location
- Country: Romania
- Counties: Alba County

Physical characteristics
- Source: Mount Tărtărău
  - location: Șureanu Mountains
  - coordinates: 45°28′11″N 23°37′04″E
  - elevation: 1,595 m (5,233 ft)
- Mouth: Sebeș
  - location: Lake Oașa
  - coordinates: 45°31′55″N 23°36′48″E
  - elevation: 1,268 m (4,160 ft)
- Length: 9 km (5.6 mi)
- Basin size: 20 km^{2} (7.7 sq mi)

Basin features
- Progression: Sebeș→ Mureș→ Tisza→ Danube→ Black Sea
- Tributaries
  - left: Diudiu

The Sălanele is a left tributary of the river Sebeș in Romania. It discharges into the Lake Oașa, which is drained by the Sebeș. Its length is 9 km (5.6 mi) and its basin size is 20 km^{2} (7.7 sq mi).
