= Tărtărău =

- Location within Romania

Location
- Country: Romania
- Counties: Alba County

Physical characteristics
- Source: Mount Tărtărău
  - location: Șureanu Mountains
  - coordinates: 45°28′07″N 23°37′44″E
  - elevation: 1,718 m (5,636 ft)
- Mouth: Sebeș
  - coordinates: 45°30′52″N 23°39′06″E
  - elevation: 1,320 m (4,330 ft)
- Length: 8 km (5.0 mi)
- Basin size: 20 km^{2} (7.7 sq mi)

Basin features
- Progression: Sebeș→ Mureș→ Tisza→ Danube→ Black Sea

The Tărtărău is a left tributary of the river Sebeș in Romania. It flows into the Sebeș upstream from the Oașa Dam. Its length is 8 km (5.0 mi) and its basin size is 20 km^{2} (7.7 sq mi).
