= Brebu Monastery =

Coordinates: 45.181885°N 25.767086°E

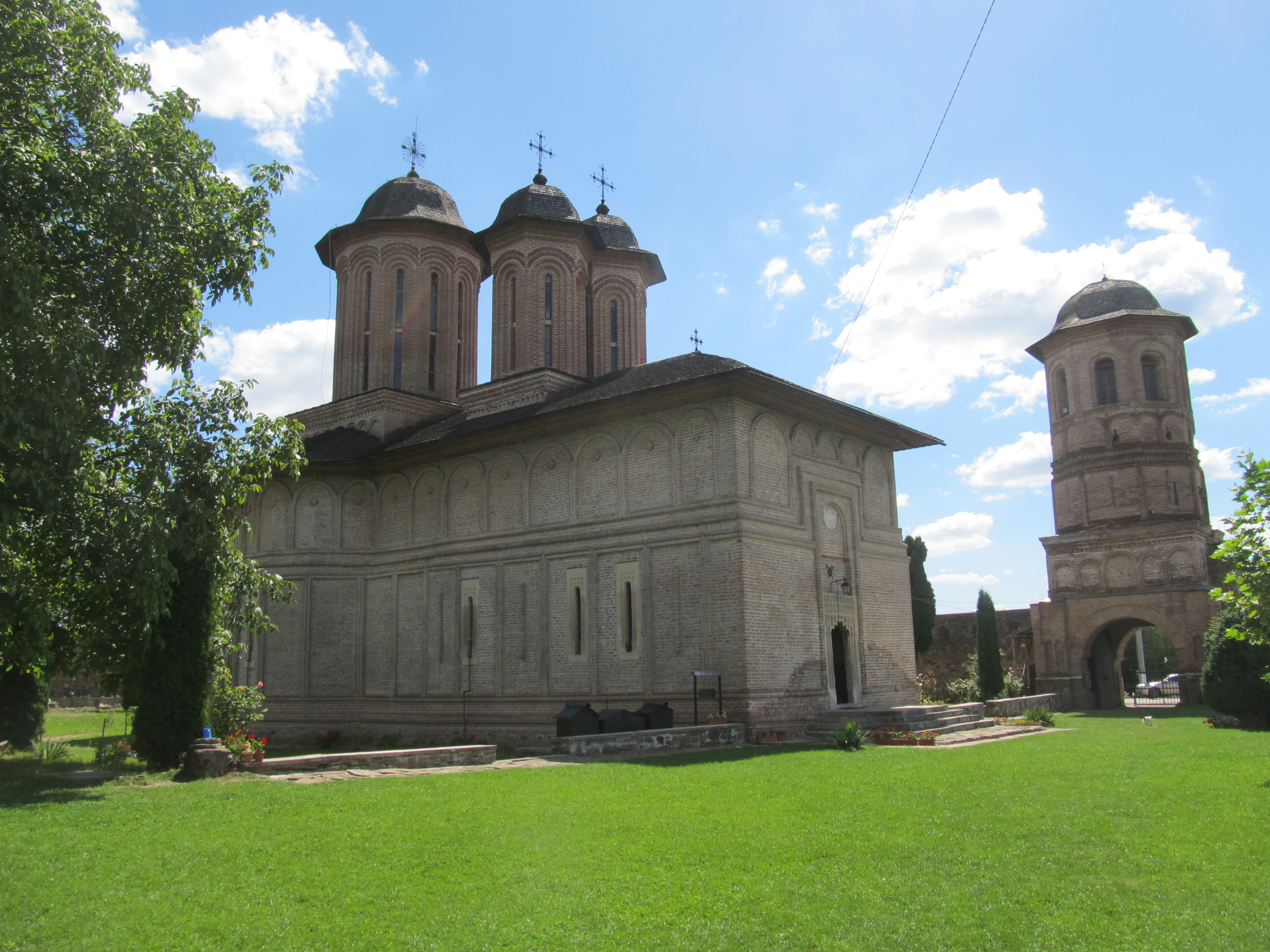

The Brebu Monastery in Romania is one of the most important architectural achievements of the rule of Matei Basarab and of Romanian art in the 17th century. Constructions began in 1640.

The Romanian Orthodox monastery is located in the present-day locality of Brebu Mânăstirei, Prahova County, Romania. It is situated in the foothills of the Bucegi and Grohotiş Mountains.

== Architecture ==
The architectural complex at Brebu is currently preserved in its initial form, being one of the few Romanian medieval monuments that is significantly preserved. The monastery's chapel is similar to that of the Dealu Monastery, and has dimensions of 30 x 10 m, constructed in a triconic formation, with a tower extending from the nave and another two smaller towers from the pre-nave. The walls of the chapel/church have a thickness of two metres, and are constructed from burnt bricks and stone. The exterior decoration is characteristic of Wallachian architecture at that time, being fairly devoid of ornaments. Some of the decorative elements resemble those of the late gothic period in Moldavia. The interior decoration of the chapel dates from 1843, and was restored by Sava Henția in 1901–1902.

The monastery's living quarters are formed by nine rooms and a hall, all of them communicating with each other. There is also a lower ground floor containing cellars. The access tower in the complex is fairly large, and is regarded as one of the most beautiful examples of such constructions found in Romania. It is situated in the southern part of the complex, and has three levels and a total height of approximately 20 metres. The third levels is used for bells, and has an open space in all four sides. Part of the exterior walls of the tower were repainted by Sava Henţia at the beginning of the 20th century.

The monastery is surrounded by six-metre-high wall, with an irregular octagonal shape. It is made out of stone and burnt bricks. The annexes are situated in the west of the complex, and today only their remains can be found. Their existence is confirmed by various milestones and markers which were erected after the site's restoration in 1963.
