= Bistra (Sebeș) =

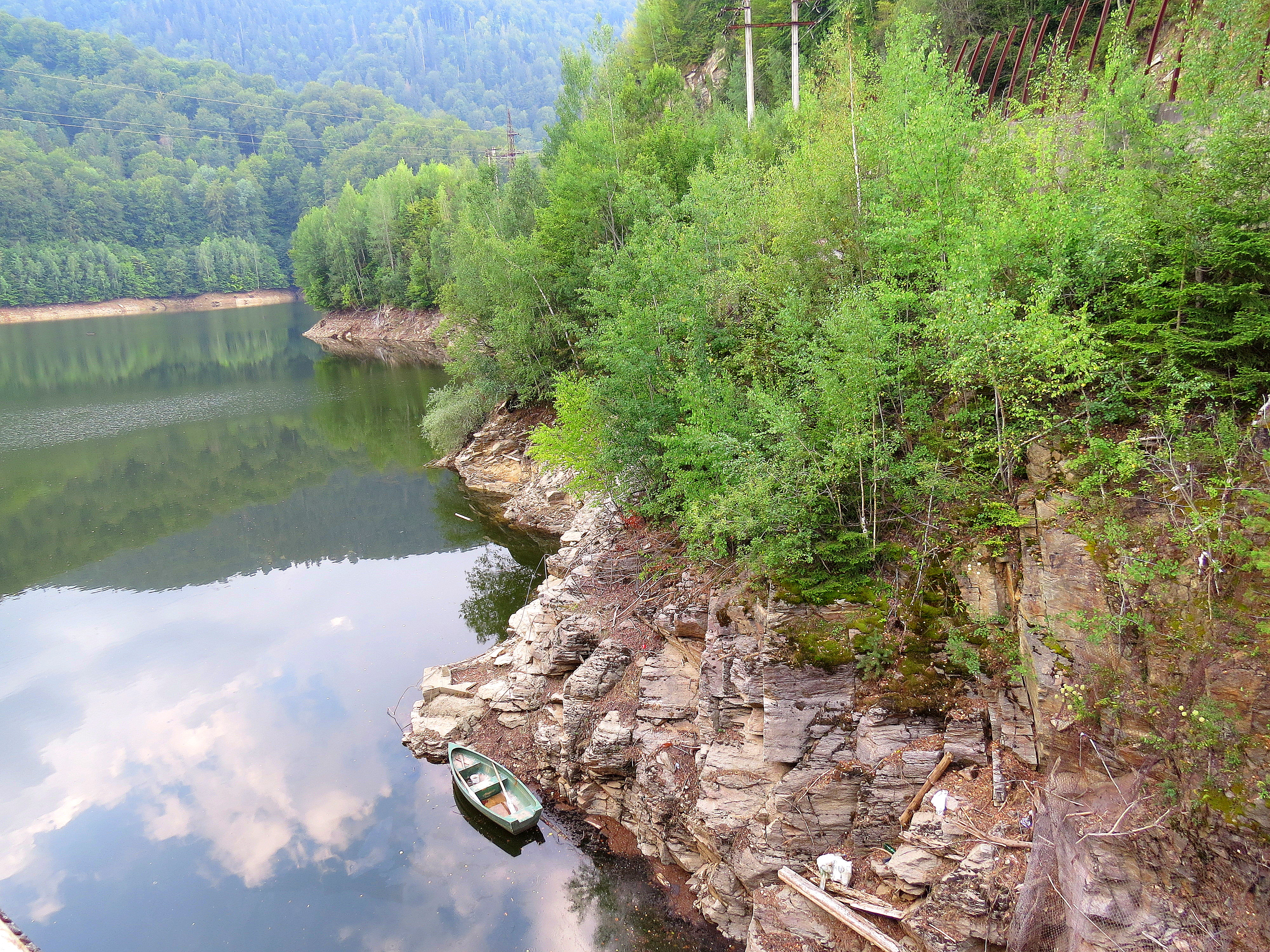

- Location within Romania

Location
- Country: Romania
- Counties: Sibiu County

Physical characteristics
- Source: Mount Strâmba Mare
  - location: Cindrel Mountains
  - coordinates: 45°39′11″N 23°44′57″E
  - elevation: 1,478 m (4,849 ft)
- Mouth: Sebeș
  - location: Lake Tău
  - coordinates: 45°41′19″N 23°37′05″E
  - elevation: 791 m (2,595 ft)
- Length: 12 km (7.5 mi)
- Basin size: 49 km^{2} (19 sq mi)

Basin features
- Progression: Sebeș→ Mureș→ Tisza→ Danube→ Black Sea
- Tributaries
  - left: Tortura

The Bistra is a right tributary of the river Sebeș in Romania. It discharges into the Tău Reservoir, which is drained by the Sebeș, near Tău Bistra. Its length is 12 km (7.5 mi), and its basin size is 49 km^{2} (19 sq mi).
