= Sebeș Lutheran church =

Heritage site in Alba County, Romania

Coordinates: 45.9577°N 23.5677°E

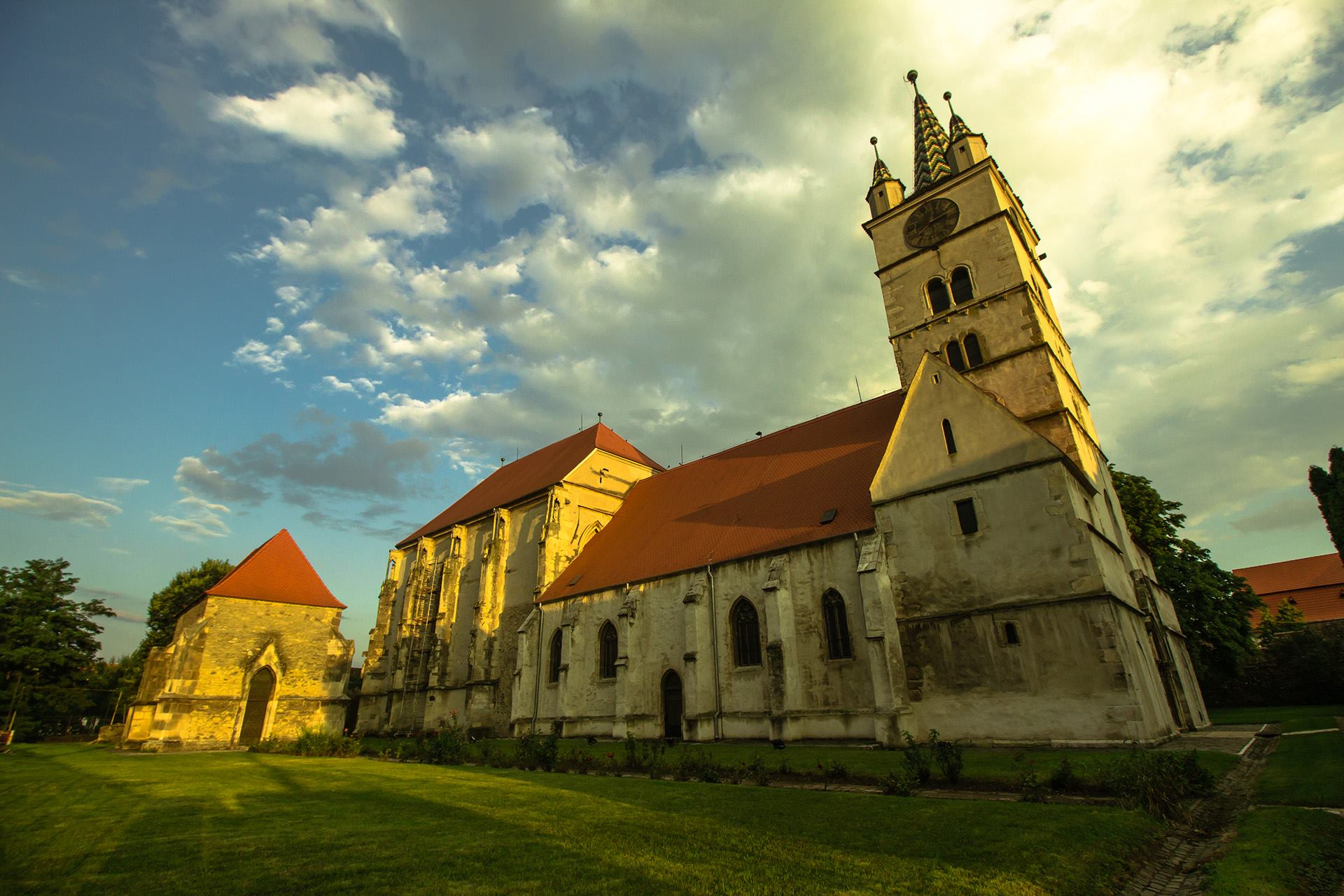
Sebeș Lutheran church

The Sebeș Lutheran church (Romanian: Biserica Evanghelică din Sebeș; German: Stadtpfarrkirche Mühlbach) is a Lutheran fortified church. It is located at 5 Piața Primăriei in the town center of Sebeș (Mühlbach), itself situated in Alba County, in the Transylvania region of Romania. The church was built by the ethnic German Transylvanian Saxon community at a time when the area belonged to the Kingdom of Hungary. Initially Roman Catholic, it became Lutheran following the Reformation.

== Description ==
Saxon colonists began a Romanesque basilica during the 12th century, but this was destroyed during the 1241–1242 Mongol invasion of Europe. It was subsequently rebuilt in Gothic style, fortified and endowed with walls. An imposing choir was added in the second half of the 14th century, during a period of local prosperity. During the 17th and 18th centuries, Sebeș became a center for craftsmen, who worked on extending the church. During World War I, the bells were confiscated, melted and turned into munitions; they were replaced in 1925.

The church is listed as a historic monument by Romania's Ministry of Culture and Religious Affairs, with Saint James's Chapel (ca. 1420), the parish house and the walls being listed as separate entries.

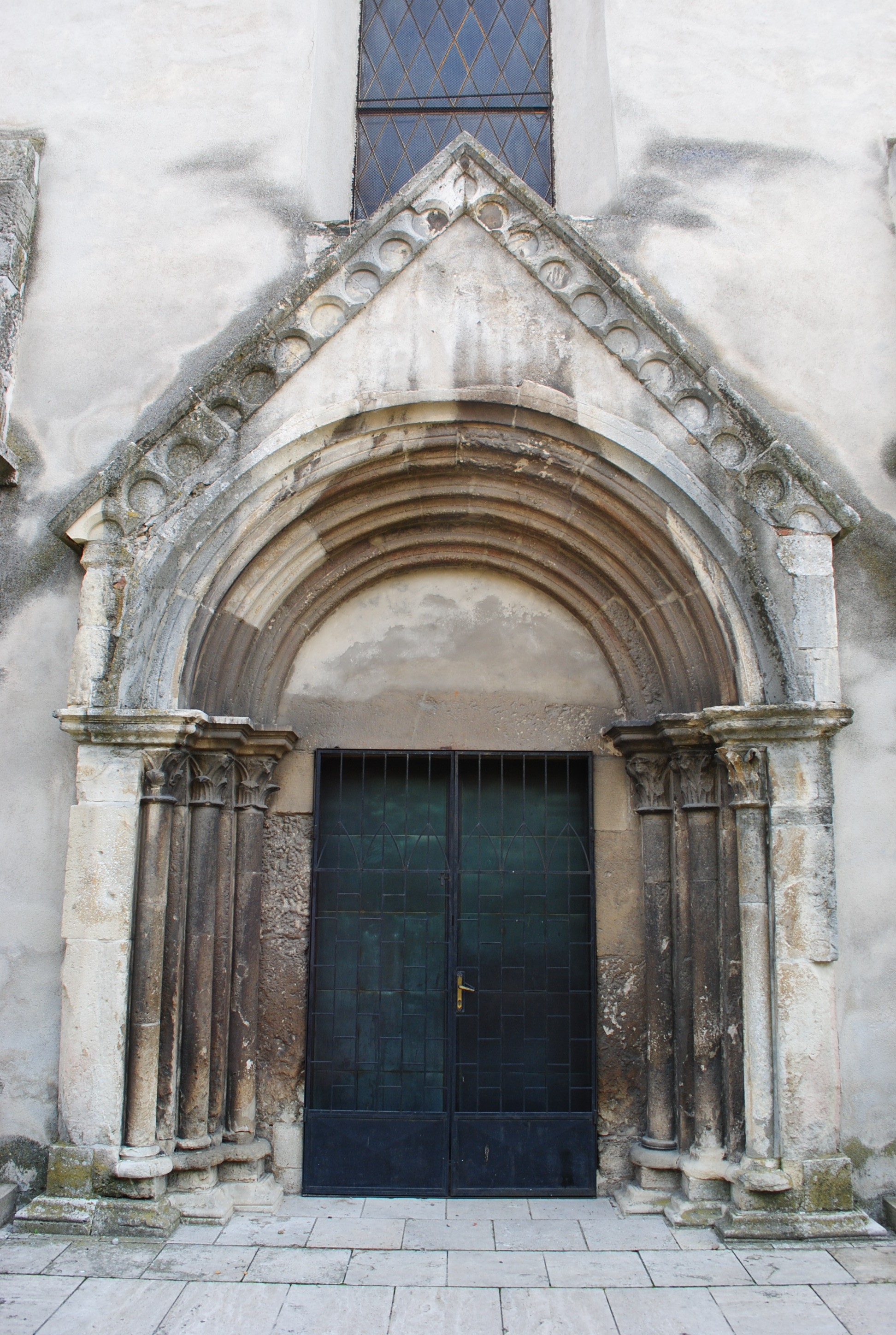
Portal

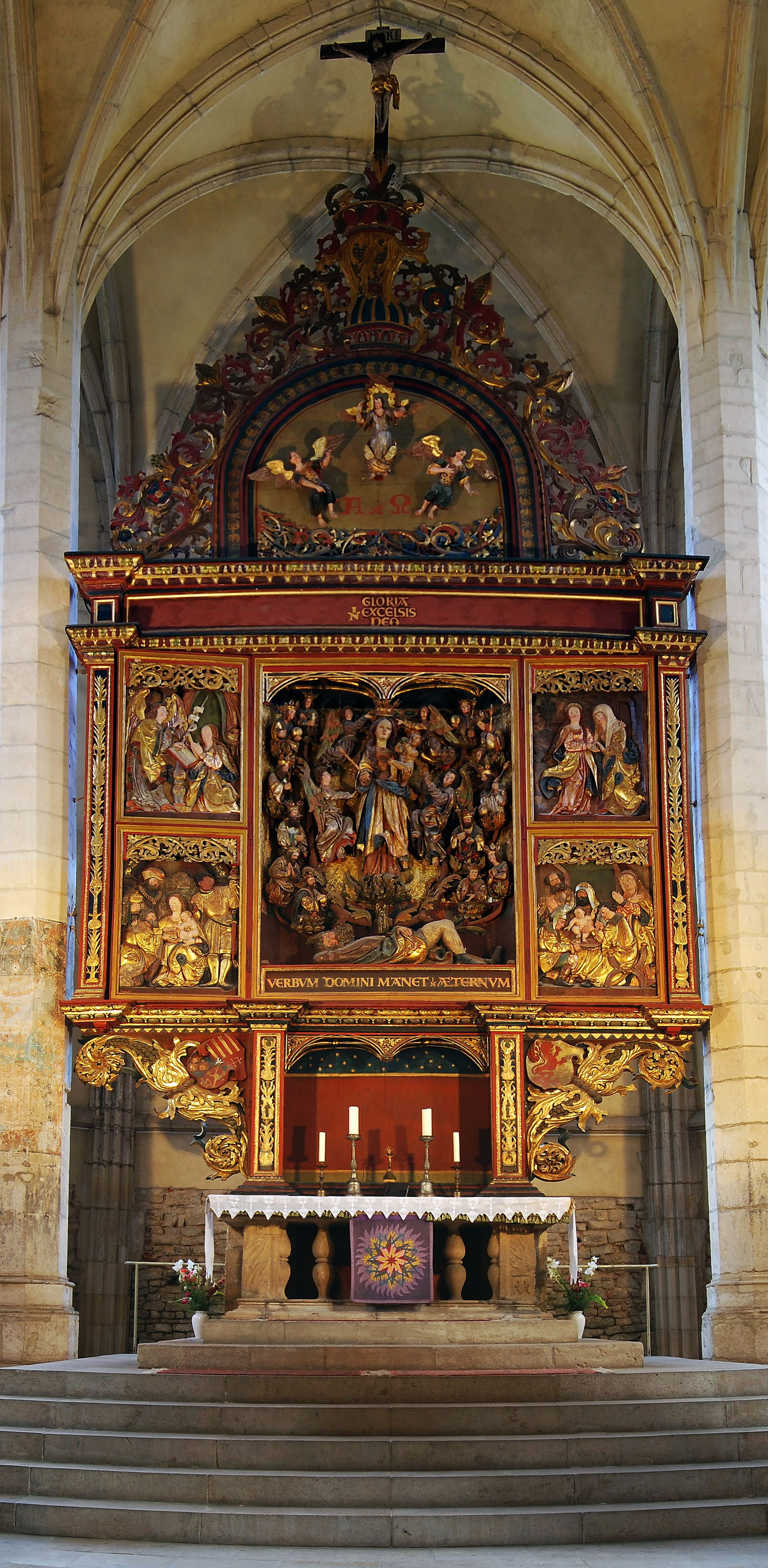
Altar

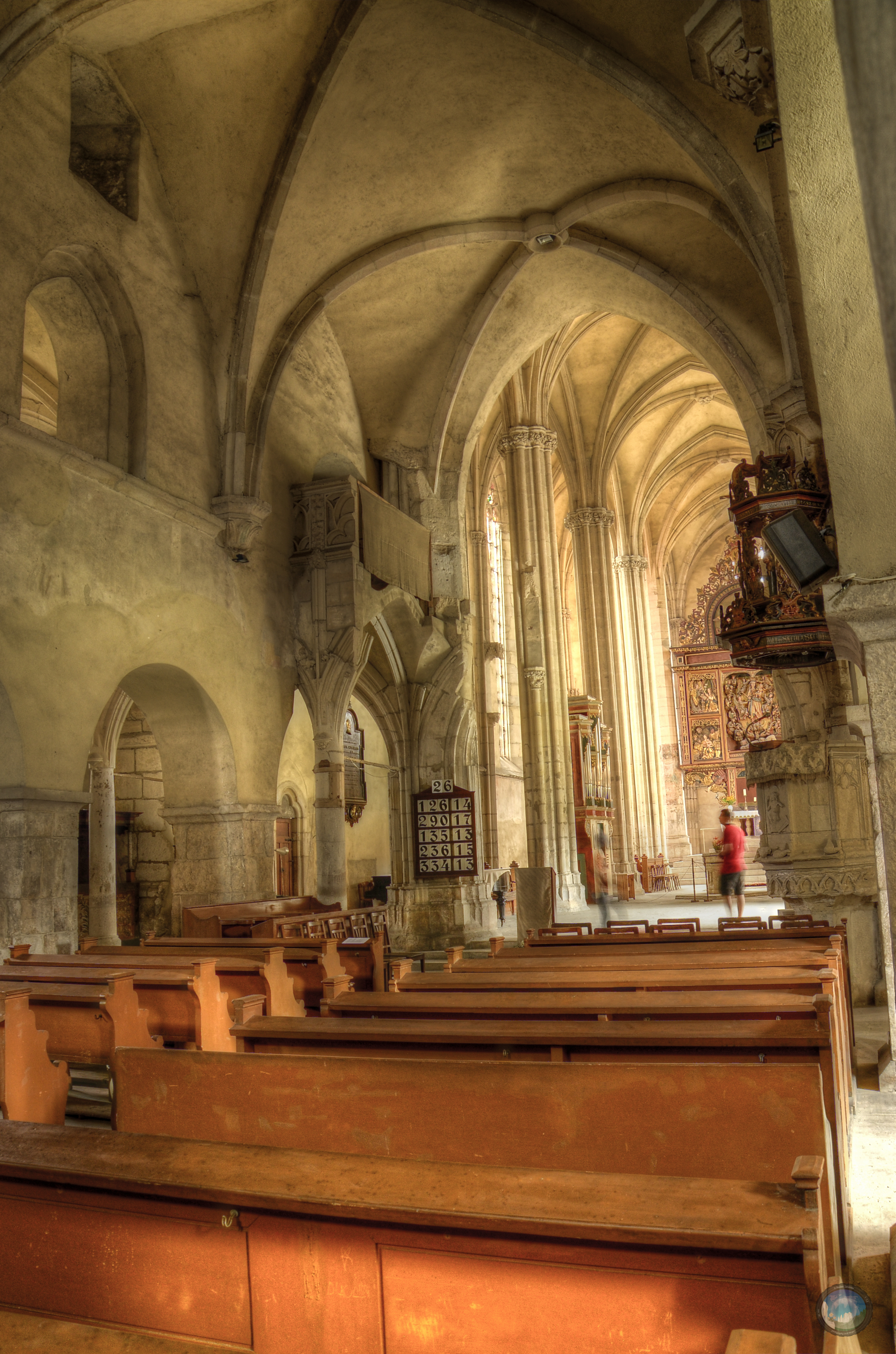
Nave

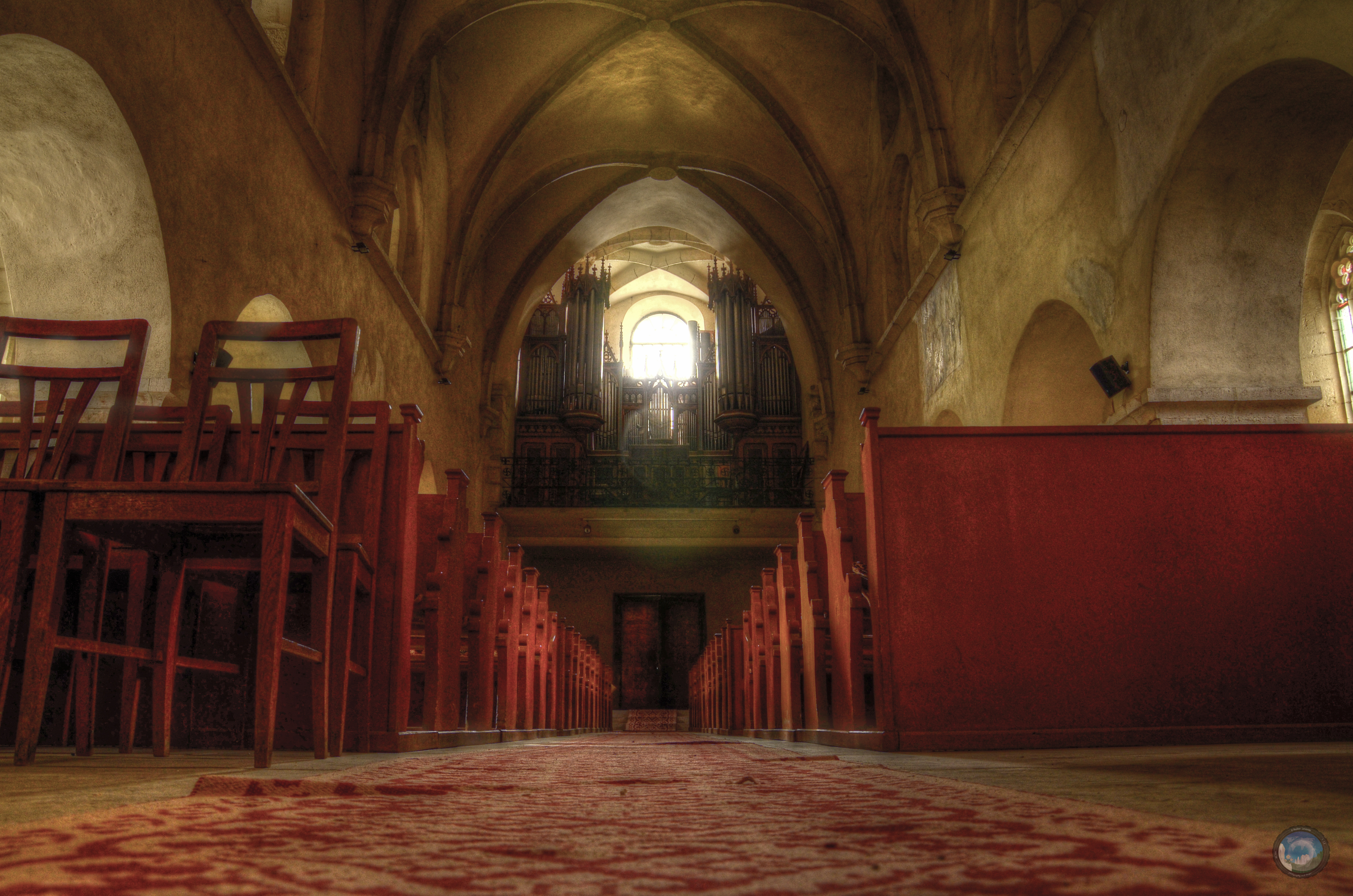
Organ

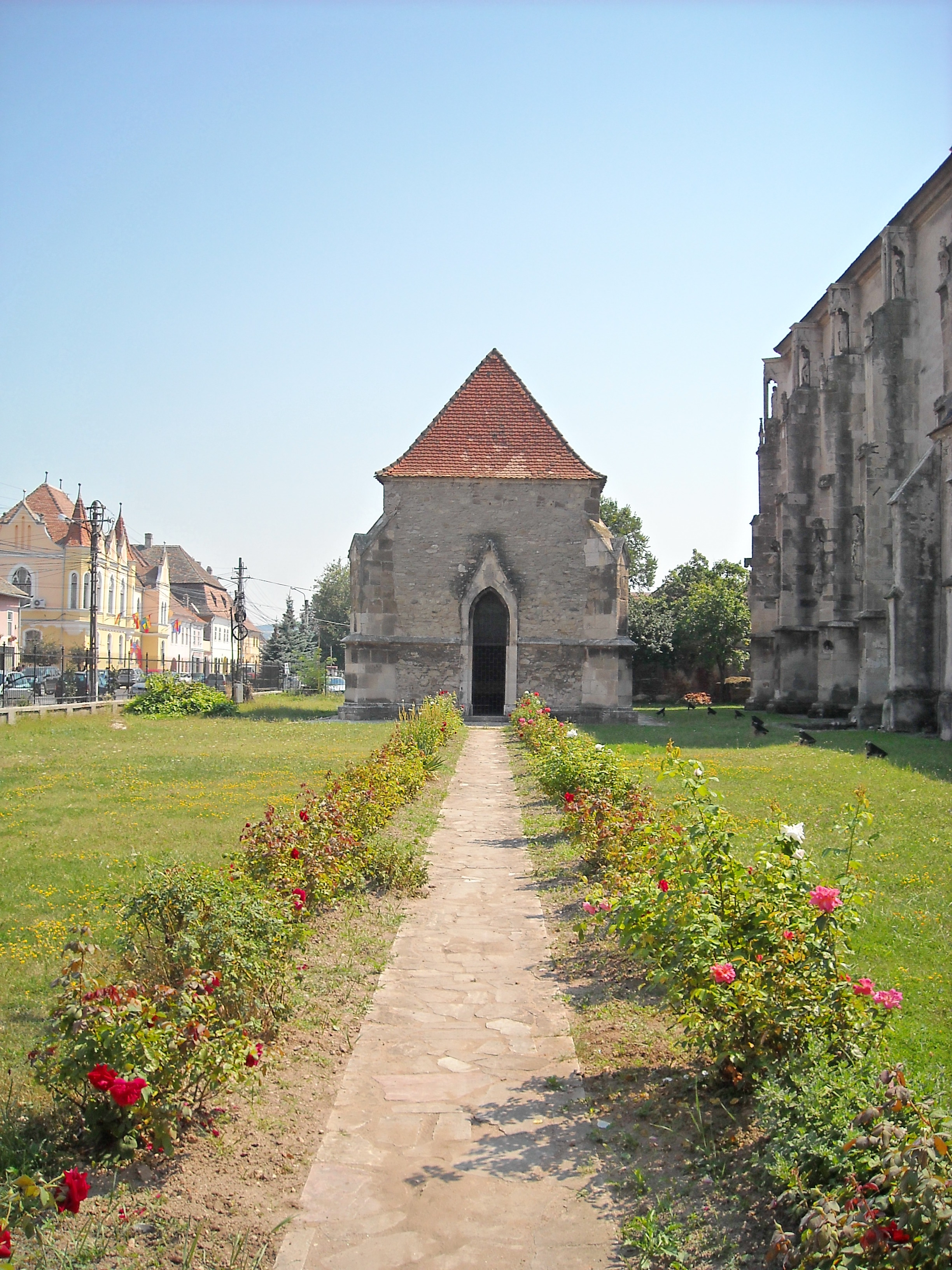
Saint James's Chapel
