= Șugag =

- Commune
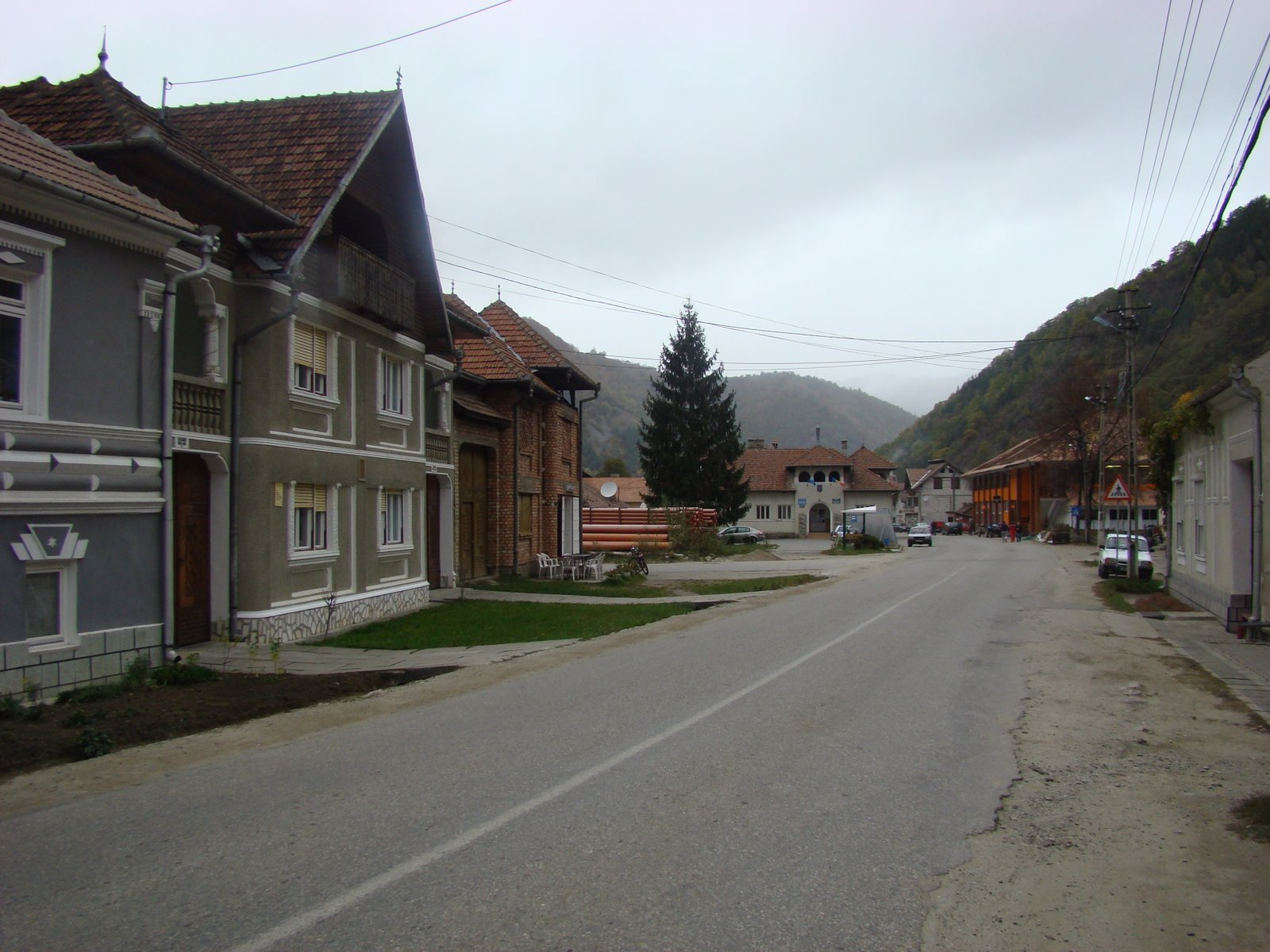
- View of Șugag

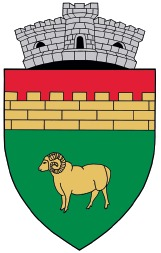
- Coat of arms

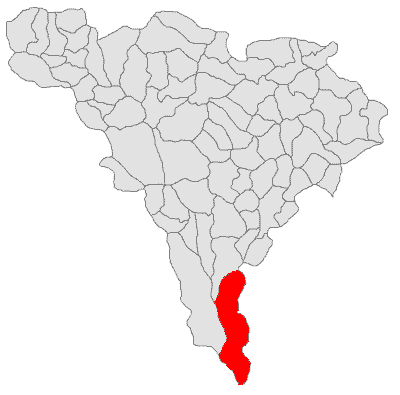
- Location in Alba County

- Location in Romania
- Coordinates: 45°46′N 23°38′E
- Country: Romania
- County: Alba

Government
  - Mayor (2020–2024): Constantin Jinar (PNL)
- Area: 253.11 km^{2} (97.73 sq mi)
- Elevation: 455 m (1,493 ft)
- Population (2021-12-01): 2,602
  - Density: 10.28/km^{2} (26.63/sq mi)
- Time zone: UTC+02:00 (EET)
  - Summer (DST): UTC+03:00 (EEST)
- Postal code: 517775
- Area code: (+40) 0258
- Vehicle reg.: AB
- Website: primariasugag.ro

Șugag (German: Schugag; Hungarian: Sugág) is a commune located in Alba County, Transylvania, Romania. It is composed of seven villages: Arți (Arctelep), Bârsana (Barzonatelep), Dobra (Dobratelep), Jidoștina (Jidostinatelep), Mărtinie (Martiniatelep), Șugag, and Tău Bistra (Vartótelek).

The commune is situated at the southwestern edge of the Transylvanian Plateau, at an altitude of 455 m (1,493 ft), on the banks of the river Sebeș and its tributaries, the Bistra and the Mărtinia. It is located at the southern extremity of Alba County, 26 km (16 mi) from the city of Sebeș and 43 km (27 mi) from the county seat, Alba Iulia, on the border with Sibiu County.

Șugag is crossed south to north by the Transalpina (DN67C) national road. The Șugag Dam on the river Sebeș creates the reservoir Lake Tău Bistra.

== Natives ==
Historical population
| Year | Pop. | ±% |
|---|---|---|
| 1850 | 1,222 | — |
| 1880 | 1,649 | +34.9% |
| 1890 | 1,671 | +1.3% |
| 1900 | 2,084 | +24.7% |
| 1910 | 2,210 | +6.0% |
| 1920 | 2,281 | +3.2% |
| 1930 | 2,216 | −2.8% |
| 1941 | 2,276 | +2.7% |
| 1956 | 3,087 | +35.6% |
| 1966 | 3,697 | +19.8% |
| 1977 | 6,925 | +87.3% |
| 1992 | 4,258 | −38.5% |
| 2002 | 3,239 | −23.9% |
| 2011 | 2,726 | −15.8% |
| 2021 | 2,602 | −4.5% |
Source: INS, Census data

- Zachary DeLorean, father of American automotive executive John DeLorean, was born and raised in Șugag.
