= Ciban =

- Location within Romania

Location
- Country: Romania
- Counties: Sibiu County

Physical characteristics
- Mouth: Sebeș
  - coordinates: 45°36′04″N 23°39′08″E
  - elevation: 1,140 m (3,740 ft)
- Length: 9 km (5.6 mi)
- Basin size: 48 km^{2} (19 sq mi)

Basin features
- Progression: Sebeș→ Mureș→ Tisza→ Danube→ Black Sea
- Tributaries
  - left: Marginea

The Ciban is a right tributary of the river Sebeș in Romania. It discharges into the Sebeș downstream of the Oașa Dam. Its length is 9 km (5.6 mi) and its basin size is 48 km^{2} (19 sq mi).
