= Mărtinia =

- Location within Romania

Location
- Country: Romania
- Counties: Alba County

Physical characteristics
- Mouth: Sebeș
  - location: Mărtinie
  - coordinates: 45°47′35″N 23°36′29″E
- Length: 15 km (9.3 mi)
- Basin size: 42 km^{2} (16 sq mi)

Basin features
- Progression: Sebeș→ Mureș→ Tisza→ Danube→ Black Sea

The Mărtinia (also: Mărtinie) is a left tributary of the river Sebeș in Romania. It flows into the Sebeș in the village Mărtinie. Its length is 15 km (9.3 mi) and its basin size is 42 km^{2} (16 sq mi).
