= Șugag Dam =

- Interactive map of Șugag Dam
- Location: Tău Bistra, Alba County, Romania
- Coordinates: 45.689°N 23.609°E

Dam and spillways
- Type of dam: Double-arch dam
- Impounds: Sebeș
- Height: 78 m (256 ft)

Reservoir
- Total capacity: 21,000,000 m^{3} (740,000,000 ft^{3})
- Surface area: 0.81 km^{2} (0.31 mi^{2})

Power Station
- Installed capacity: 150 MW
- Annual generation: 260 GWh

The Șugag Dam is a large hydroelectric dam on the river Sebeș situated in Romania. It creates the reservoir Lake Tău Bistra. The project was started and finished in the 1980s and it was made up by the construction of a double arched concrete dam measuring 78 m (256 ft) high. The facility generates power by utilizing two turbines, totalling the installed capacity to 150 MW, and generating 260 GWh of electricity annually.

== See also ==
- List of power stations in Romania
