= Săsciori =

- Commune
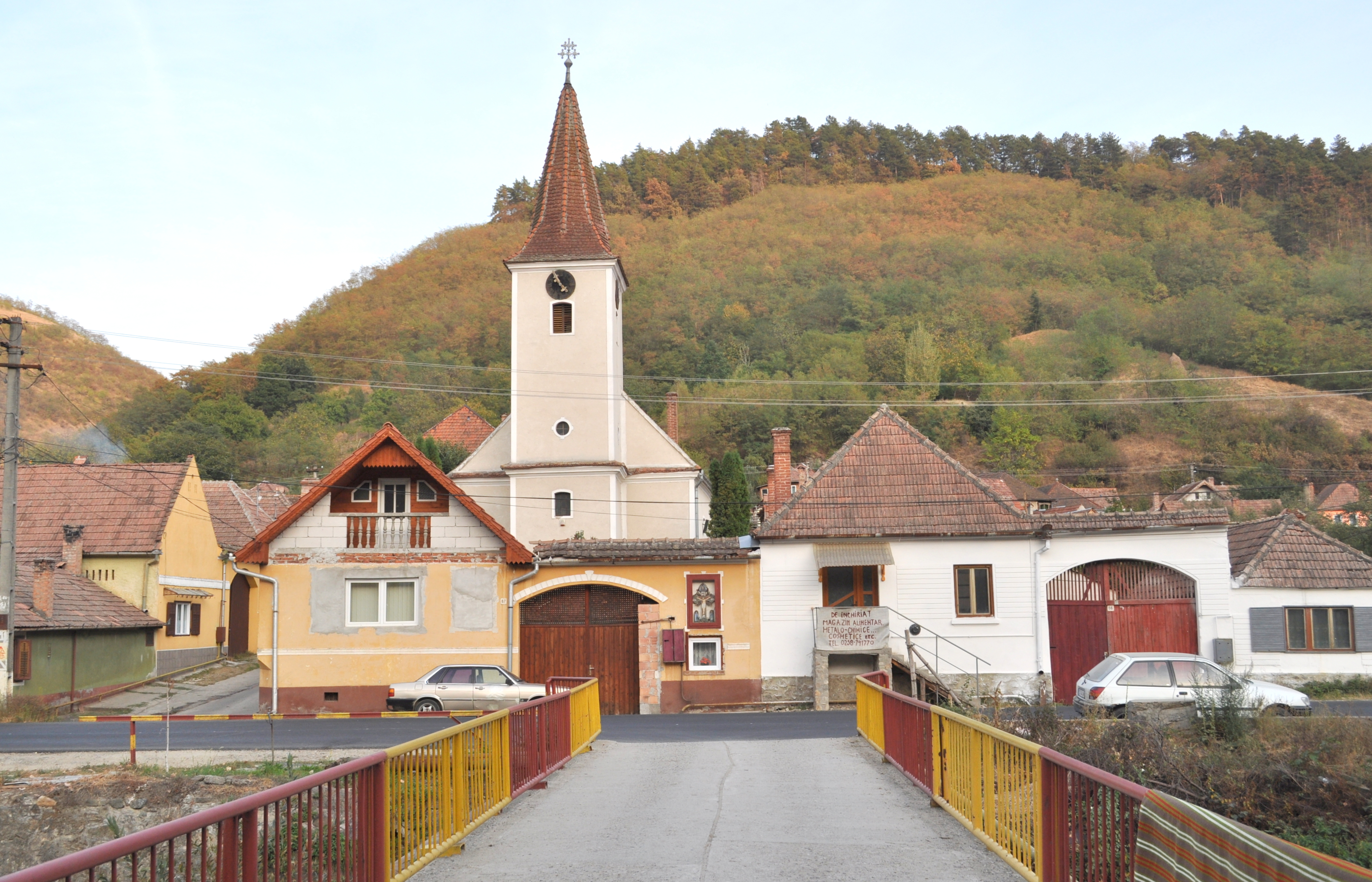
- Church of the Assumption in Laz

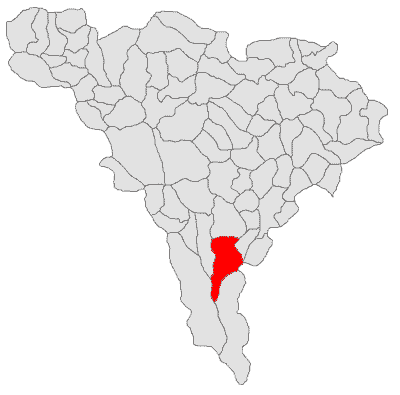
- Location in Alba County

- Location in Romania
- Coordinates: 45°52′N 23°35′E
- Country: Romania
- County: Alba

Government
  - Mayor (2020–2024): Nicolae Florin Morar (PNL)
- Area: 121.36 km^{2} (46.86 sq mi)
- Elevation: 551 m (1,808 ft)
- Population (2021-12-01): 5,820
  - Density: 48.0/km^{2} (124/sq mi)
- Time zone: UTC+02:00 (EET)
  - Summer (DST): UTC+03:00 (EEST)
- Postal code: 517660
- Area code: +40 x58
- Vehicle reg.: AB
- Website: www.comunasasciori.ro

Săsciori (German: Schweis, Sassenberg; Hungarian: Szászcsór) is a commune located in Alba County, Transylvania, Romania. It is composed of nine villages: Căpâlna (Sebeskápolna), Dumbrava (Sebeskákova), Laz (Sebesláz), Loman (Lomány), Pleși (Plesitelep), Răchita (Rekitta), Săsciori, Sebeșel (Sebeshely), and Tonea (Toneatelep).

The commune lies in the southwestern reaches of the Transylvanian Plateau, on the banks of the river Sebeș. It is located in the southern part of Alba County, 10 km (6.2 mi) south of Sebeș and 25 km (16 mi) south of the county seat, Alba Iulia.

Săsciori is crossed by national road Transalpina (DN67C), which starts in Sebeș and runs due south over the Parâng Mountains to Novaci, in Gorj County.

Căpâlna village is the site of the Dacian fortress of Căpâlna.

Historical population
| Year | Pop. | ±% |
|---|---|---|
| 1850 | 4,993 | — |
| 1910 | 6,531 | +30.8% |
| 1966 | 5,730 | −12.3% |
| 2002 | 5,954 | +3.9% |
| 2011 | 5,757 | −3.3% |
| 2021 | 5,820 | +1.1% |
Source: Census data

At the 2011 census, the commune had a population of 5,757; of those, 95.73% were ethnic Romanians. By the 2021 census, the population had increased to 5,820, of which 84.4% were Romanians.

== Natives ==
- Sava Henția (1848 – 1904), painter, decorator, and illustrator
