= Sava Henția =

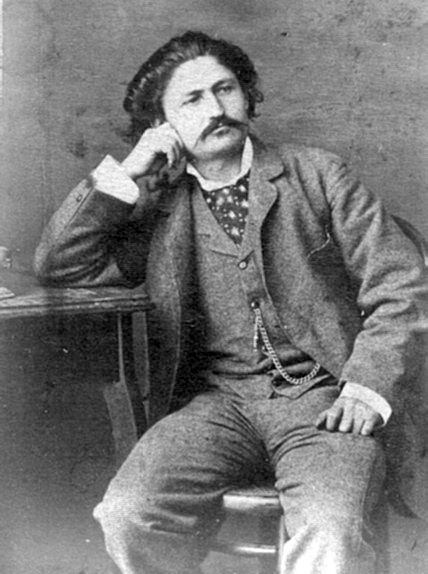
- Photo ~ 1880 - 1894
- Born: 1 February 1848; Sebeșel
- Died: 21 February 1904 (aged 56)
- Education: Theodor Aman, Gheorghe Tattarescu, Alexander Cabanel
- Known for: Painting, illustration, mural
- Movement: Realism

Sava Henția (1 February 1848, Sebeșel - 21 February 1904, Sebeșel) was an Imperial Austrian-born Romanian painter, decorator and illustrator.

== Biography ==
He was one of fourteen surviving children of a priest. In 1862, after finishing his primary education, he was apprenticed to an uncle, who taught him how to retouch photographs. The following year, he caught typhoid fever and the quinine that was used to treat it damaged his hearing.

His work with photographs encouraged him to pursue a career in art. From 1865 to 1870, he studied at the Bucharest National University of Arts with Gheorghe Tattarescu and Theodor Aman. He was then able to obtain a scholarship and went to Paris, where he enrolled at the Académie des Beaux-Arts and found a position in the prestigious workshop of Alexandre Cabanel. In 1873, he returned to Bucharest and became a teacher of drawing and calligraphy at the "Elena Doamna" orphan asylum.

Four years later, on the recommendation of Doctor Carol Davila, he became a correspondent with the Army ambulance corps and participated in the Russo-Turkish War (War of Independence), sketching numerous scenes of campaigns and battles, many of which he later made into watercolors. His painting of an artillery battery from Calafat was used on a one Leu postage stamp in 1977.

After the war, he worked as a teacher, interior decorator and book illustrator. Between 1901 and 1902, he was one of the artists commissioned to restore the murals and altarpieces at the Brebu Monastery. At the Cernica Monastery, he produced portraits of that institution's founders.

His home in Sebeș became an historical monument. It was not properly maintained, however, and the roof collapsed in 2001. After further deterioration, all that remained was the front wall and foundation. It was later taken off the list of historical monuments. A street in Bucharest is named after him.

== Selected paintings ==
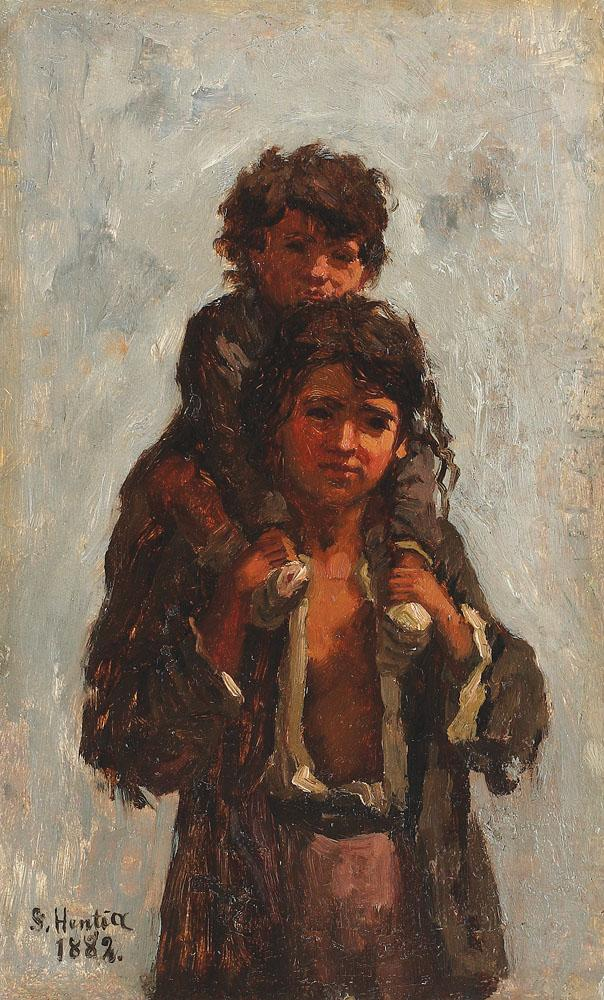
Brothers (1882)

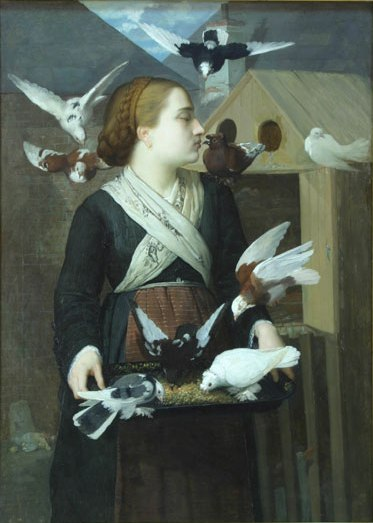
Girl with Pigeons (1875)

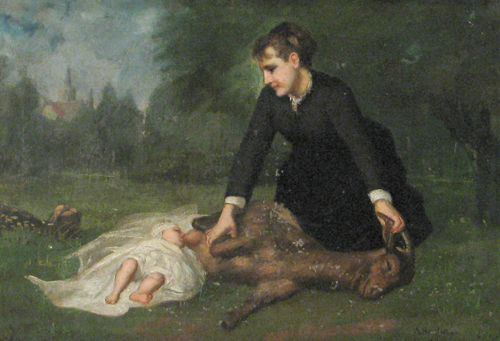
Adoptive Mother (1890)

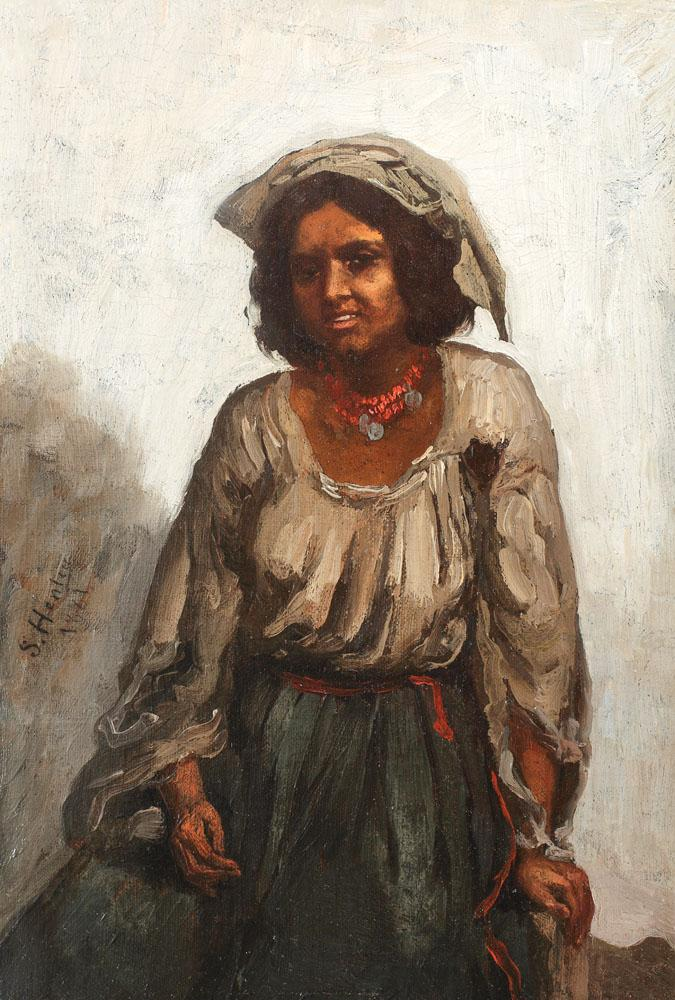
Portrait of a Gypsy (1881)

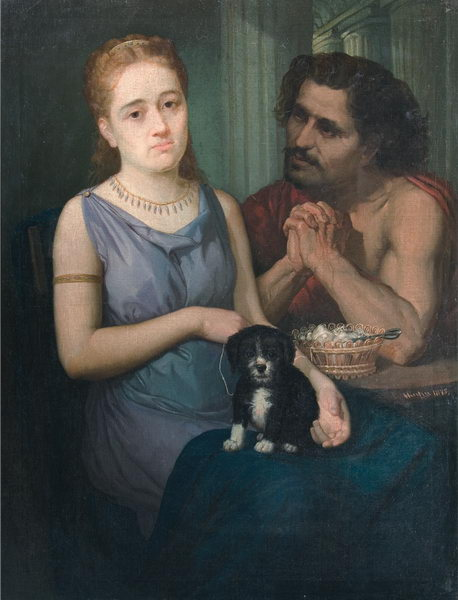
Self-portrait with Fiancée
(Ana Dăncilă)
