= Sebeș =

- Municipality
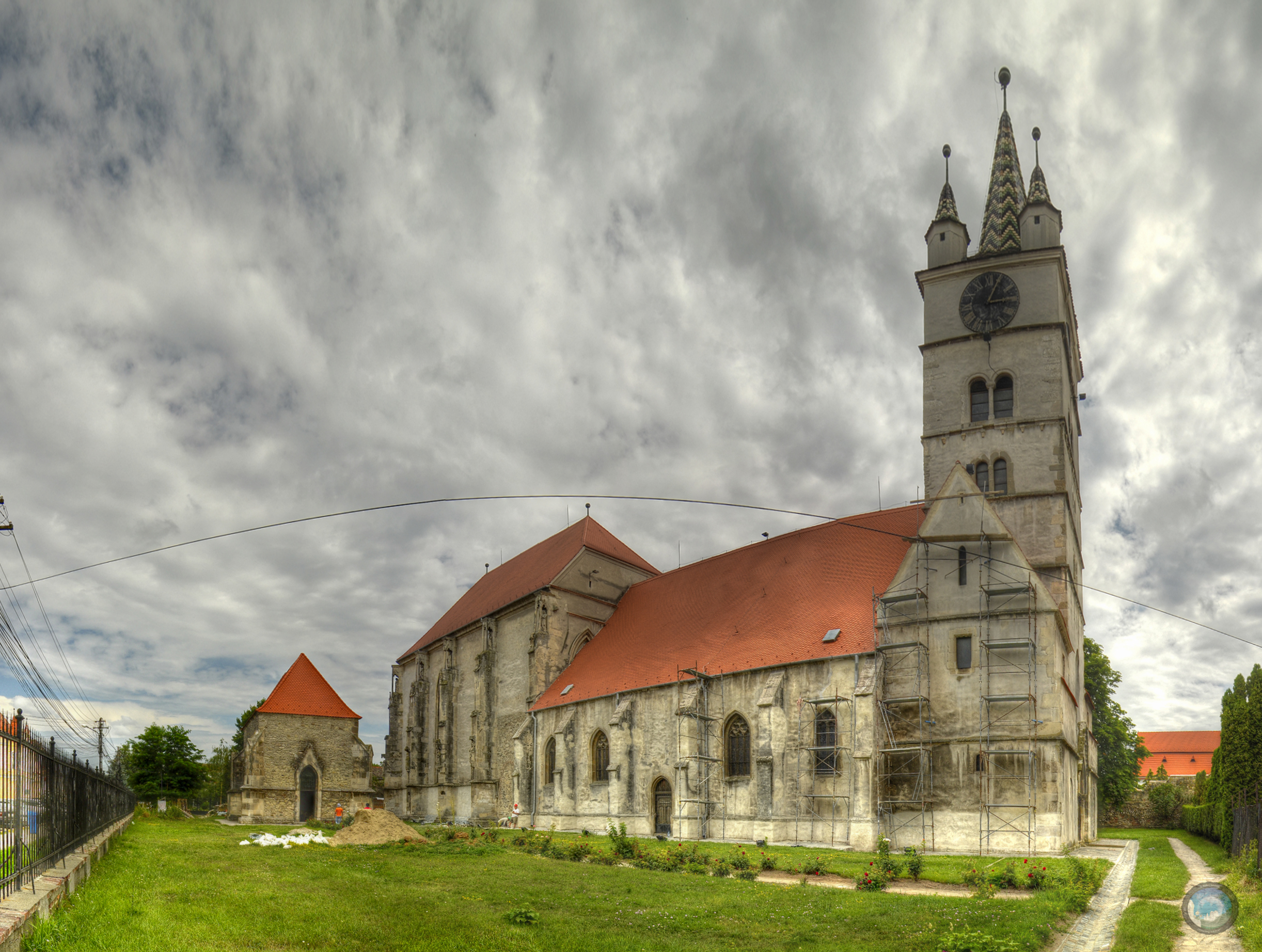
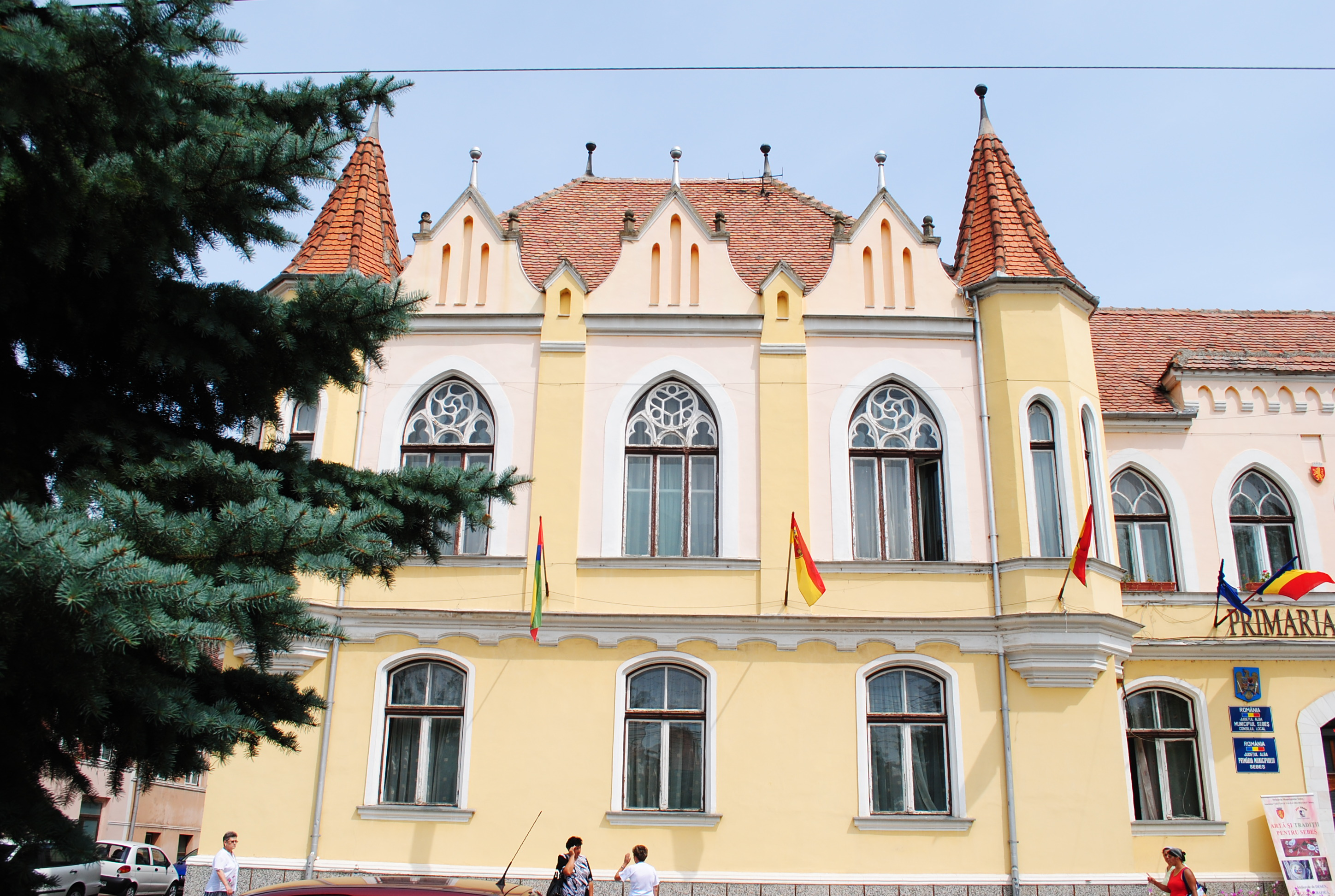
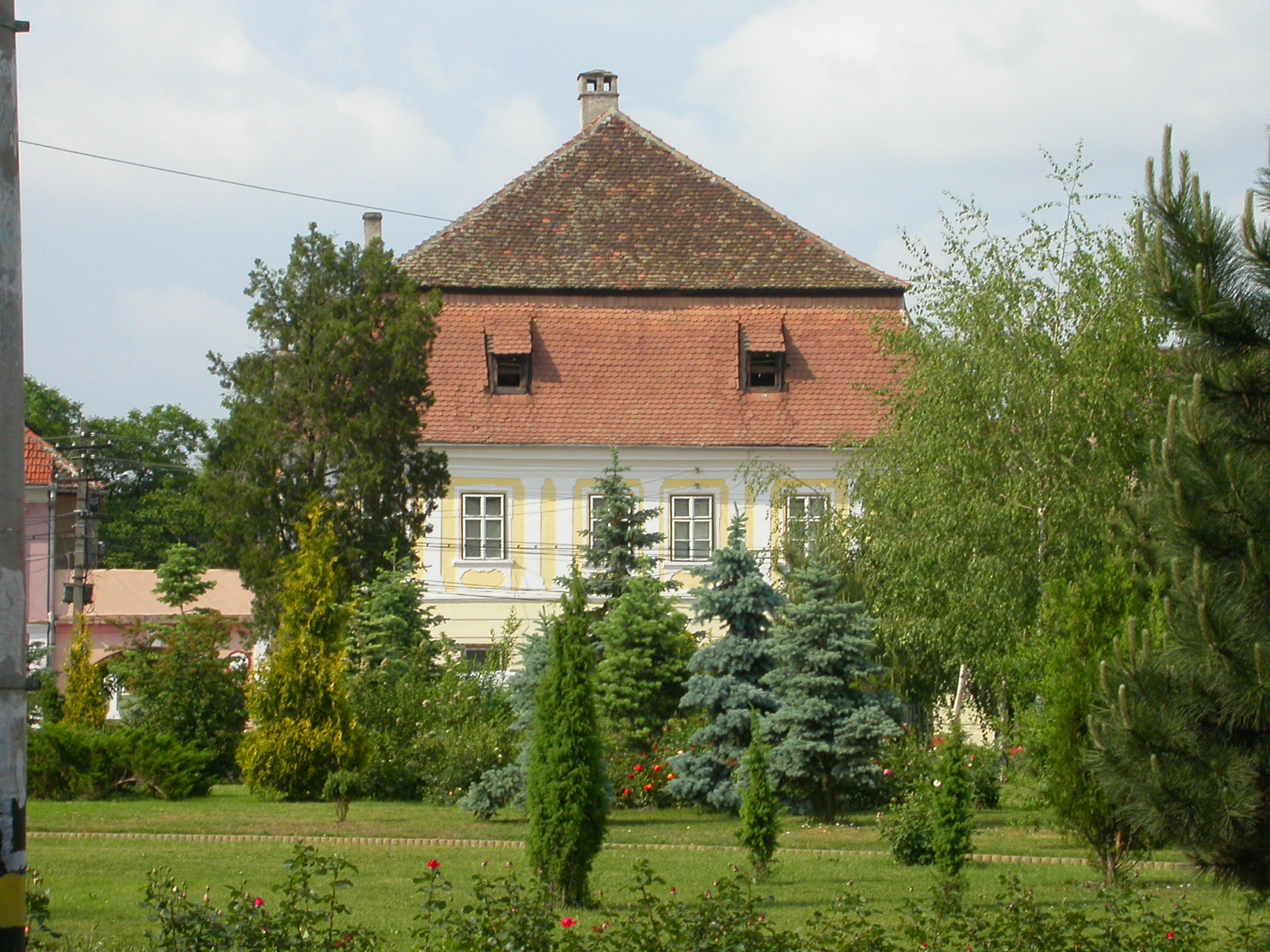
- Sebeș Lutheran church Sebeș City Hall Zapolya house

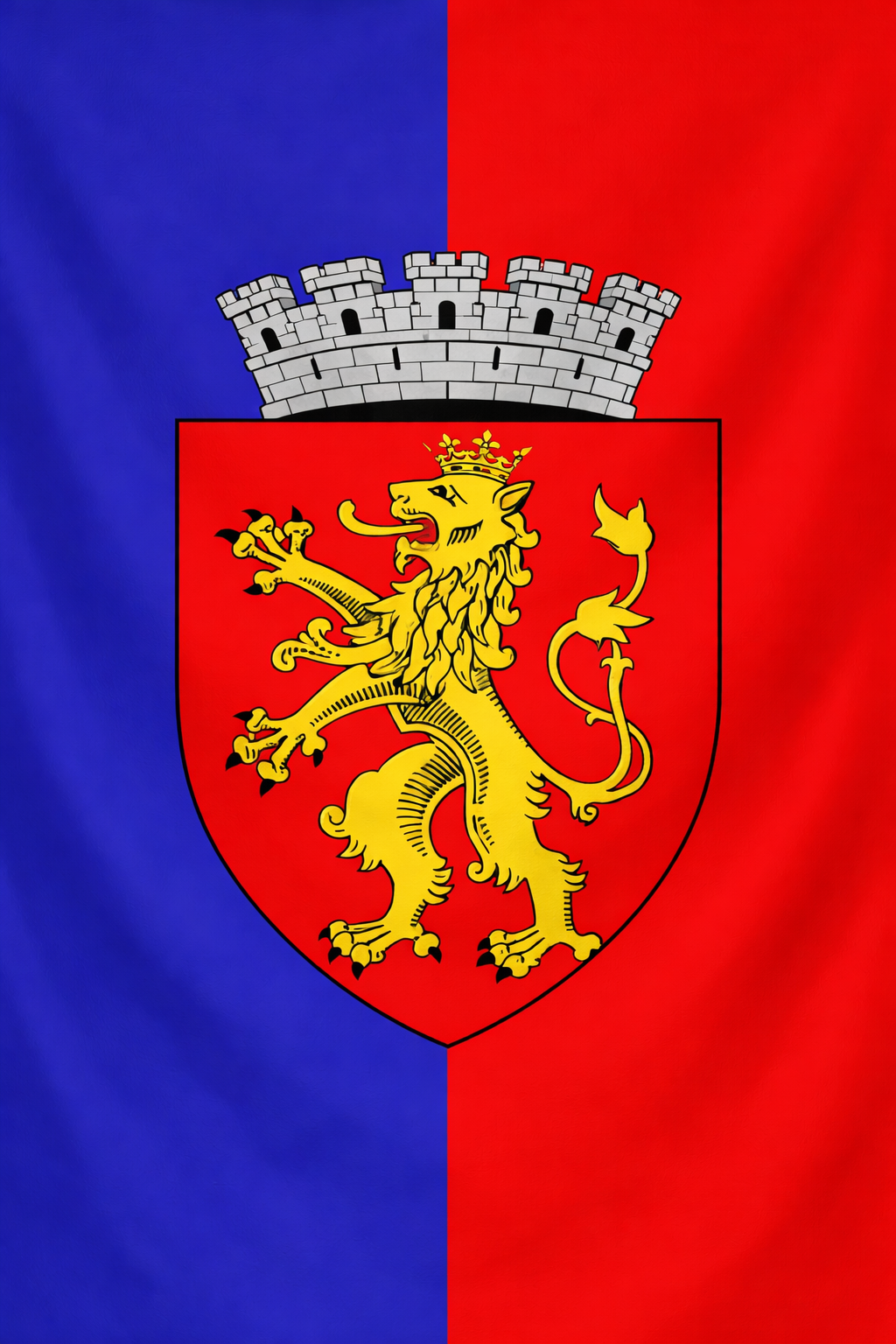
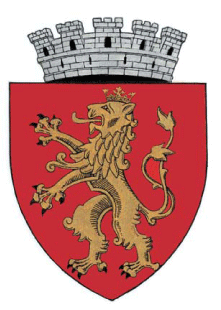
- Flag Coat of arms

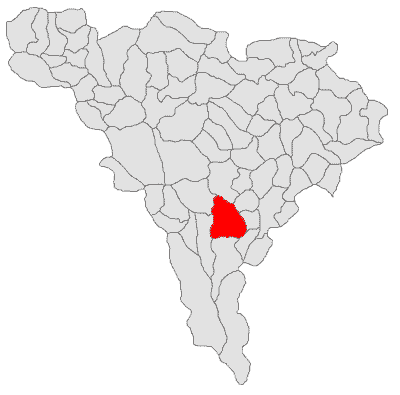
- Location in Alba County

- Location in Romania
- Coordinates: 45°57′36″N 23°34′12″E
- Country: Romania
- County: Alba

Government
  - Mayor (2024–2028): Dorin Gheorghe Nistor (PNL)
- Area: 115.45 km^{2} (44.58 sq mi)
- Elevation: 262 m (860 ft)
- Population (2021-12-01): 26,490
  - Density: 229.4/km^{2} (594.3/sq mi)
- Time zone: UTC+02:00 (EET)
  - Summer (DST): UTC+03:00 (EEST)
- Postal code: 515800
- Area code: (+40) 02 58
- Vehicle reg.: AB
- Website: www.primariasebes.ro

Sebeș (Romanian pronunciation: [ˈsebeʃ]; German: Mühlbach; Hungarian: Szászsebes; Transylvanian Saxon: Melnbach) is a city in Alba County, central Romania, southwestern Transylvania.

== Geography ==
The city lies in the Mureș River valley and straddles the river Sebeș. It is at the crossroads of two main highways in Romania: the A1 motorway coming from Sibiu and going towards Deva and the A10 motorway going towards Alba Iulia and Cluj-Napoca. Their national road counterparts passing through the city are the DN1 (E81) and the DN7 (E68), both of which also come from Sibiu.

Sebeș is situated 15 km (9.3 mi) south of the county capital, Alba Iulia. It has three villages under its administration:

- Petrești (Petersdorf; Péterfalva) – 3.5 km (2.2 mi) south
- Lancrăm (Langendorf; Lámkerék) – 2 km (1.2 mi) north
- Răhău (Reichau; Rehó) – 6 km (3.7 mi) east.

== Climate ==
Sebeș has a humid continental climate (Cfb in the Köppen climate classification).

Climate data for Sebeș
Month	Jan	Feb	Mar	Apr	May	Jun	Jul	Aug	Sep	Oct	Nov	Dec	Year
Mean daily maximum °C (°F)	2.7 (36.9)	5.2 (41.4)	10.3 (50.5)	16.1 (61.0)	20.5 (68.9)	23.8 (74.8)	25.8 (78.4)	26.1 (79.0)	20.9 (69.6)	15.4 (59.7)	9.8 (49.6)	4 (39)	15.1 (59.1)
Daily mean °C (°F)	−0.8 (30.6)	1.1 (34.0)	5.4 (41.7)	11 (52)	15.7 (60.3)	19.3 (66.7)	21.1 (70.0)	21.3 (70.3)	16.3 (61.3)	10.9 (51.6)	5.8 (42.4)	0.7 (33.3)	10.7 (51.2)
Mean daily minimum °C (°F)	−4 (25)	−2.6 (27.3)	0.7 (33.3)	5.6 (42.1)	10.5 (50.9)	14.1 (57.4)	16.1 (61.0)	16.4 (61.5)	12 (54)	6.8 (44.2)	2.5 (36.5)	−2.2 (28.0)	6.3 (43.4)
Average precipitation mm (inches)	44 (1.7)	43 (1.7)	57 (2.2)	82 (3.2)	97 (3.8)	118 (4.6)	103 (4.1)	85 (3.3)	71 (2.8)	57 (2.2)	47 (1.9)	52 (2.0)	856 (33.5)
Source: https://en.climate-data.org/europe/romania/alba/sebes-59412/

== History ==
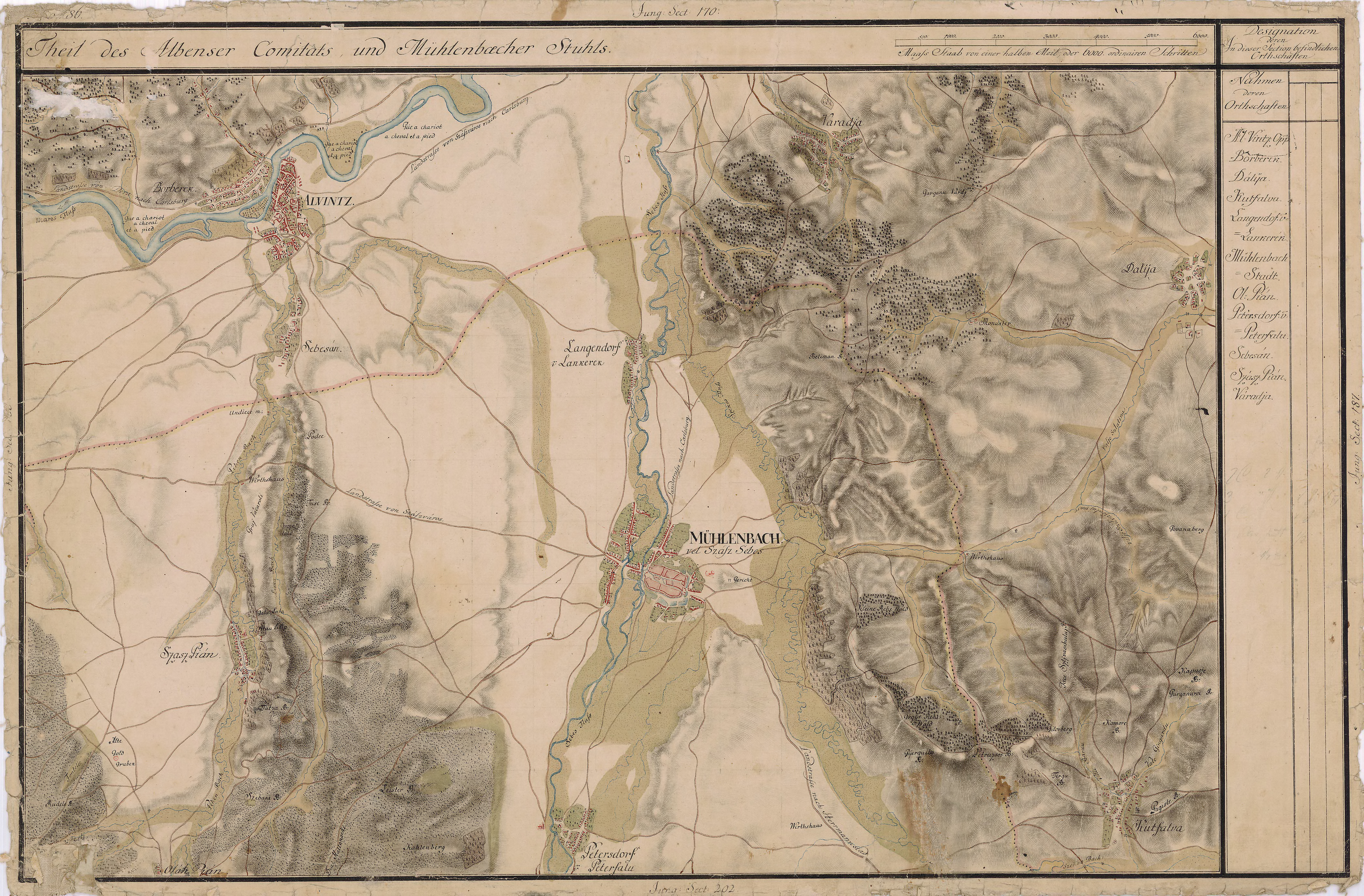
The town in the Josephinian Land Survey maps

It is believed that there has been an earlier rural settlement in this area, with Romanian and Pecheneg population, situated east of today's city. The city itself was built by German settlers — later referred as Transylvanian Saxons, but actually originating from the region of Rhine and Moselle — on the territory of the Hungarian Kingdom in the second half of the 12th century and became an important city in medieval Transylvania. Its city walls were reinforced after the Tatar (Mongol) invasions from 1241 to 1242, but the city was occupied in 1438 by the Ottoman Empire. Transylvania's voivode John I Zápolya died in Sebeș in 1540. The Transylvanian Diet met in Sebeș in 1546, 1556, 1598, and 1600. The location of the meetings, the Zápolya House, is now a museum. In the oldest documents that attest the existence of Sebeș, the city is named "Malebach"(1245), "Millenbach"(1309), names that derive from the German "Malemboch", which means "the river that carries a lot of rocks", which corresponds to the geography of the city.

Johannes Tröster's work "Das alt und neue Teutsche Dacia" published in 1666 in Nuremberg sets the date of the city's founding in 1150. The great Mongol invasion destroyed the city in 1242, after which the inhabitants rebuilt it. The old two-towered Romanesque basilica was rebuilt in early Gothic style. The current tower was built on the foundations of the two original towers. The fourteenth century brought with it a period of development of the city, it being listed in 1376 as the third commercial importance among the Saxon cities. A royal deed from 1387 enshrines the right of Sebeș to build fortress walls, although their construction had probably begun before the middle of the 14th century. It thus becomes, despite its small size, the first city in Transylvania to be completely surrounded by masonry fortifications.

After the union with Romania in December 1918, the first mayor of the city was Lionel Blaga, the brother of the Romanian poet and philosopher Lucian Blaga, who was born in the nearby village of Lancrăm.

== Politics and administration ==
The town's current local council has the following multi-party political composition, based on the results of the ballots cast at the 2020 Romanian local elections:

Party	Seats	Current Council
National Liberal Party (PNL)	14	
Social Democratic Party (PSD)	5	

== Economy ==
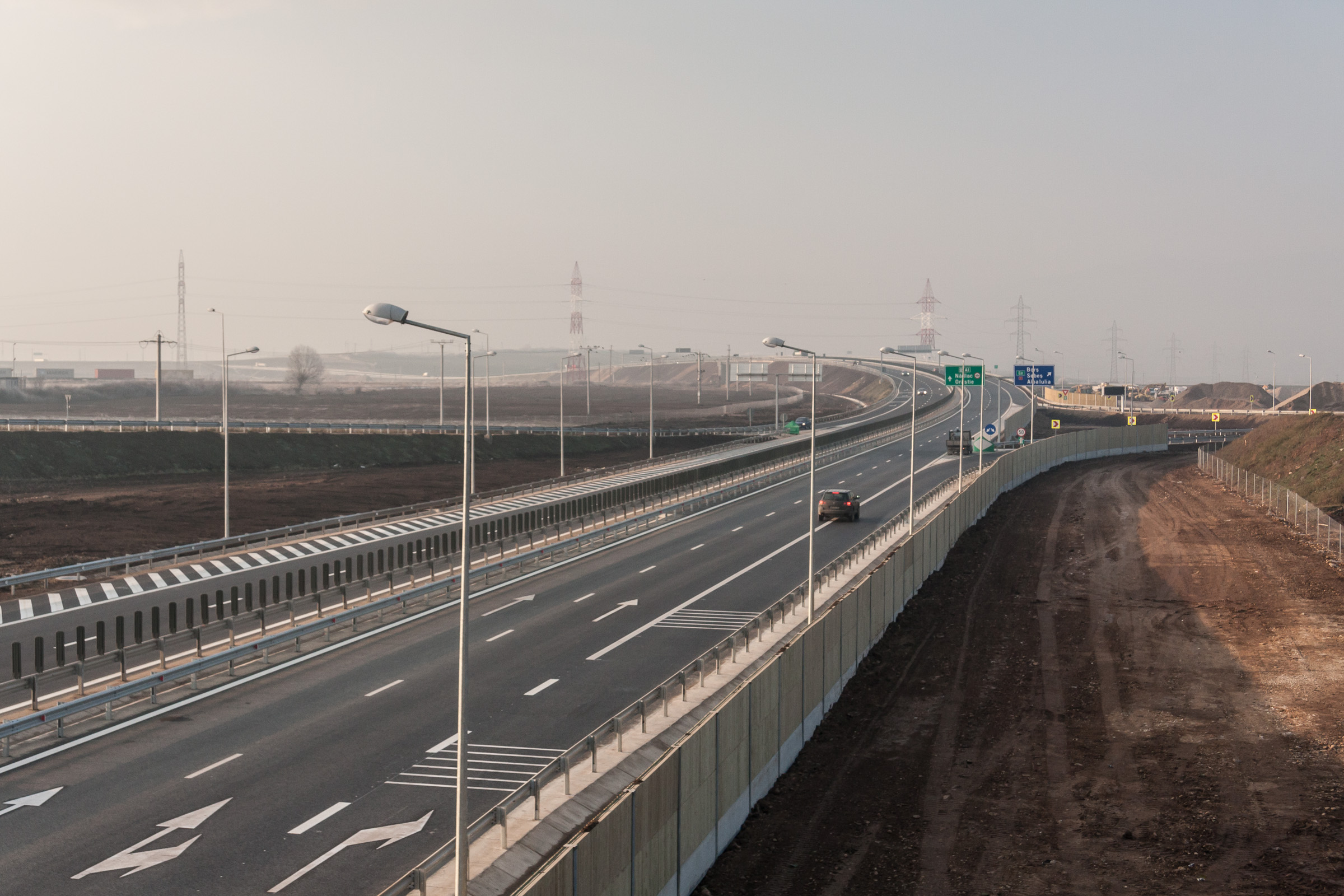
The A1 motorway at Lancărm junction

Today Sebeș is a city with a dynamic economy, having received in the last decade important foreign investments: wood processing and leather goods manufacturing are the chief domains of the local industry. As of March 2015, the unemployment rate was under 2%, the lowest of any city in Romania at the time.

In April 2016, Daimler AG's subsidiary Star Assembly started producing Mercedes-Benz nine-speed automatic transmissions in Sebeș.

== Population ==
Historical population
Year	Pop.	±%
1850	8,701	—
1910	8,504	−2.3%
1930	9,137	+7.4%
1948	10,080	+10.3%
1956	11,628	+15.4%
1966	13,715	+17.9%
1977	25,926	+89.0%
1992	29,754	+14.8%
2002	29,475	−0.9%
2011	24,165	−18.0%
2021	26,490	+9.6%
Source: Census data

At the 2021 census, Sebeș had a population of 26,490. According to the 1850 census, the population of the city at that time was 8,701 inhabitants in total, with a substantial minority of ethnic Germans. At the 2011 census, Sebeș had 24,165 inhabitants, of which:

- Romanians: 22,551, representing 93.3% (in 1850: 69.4%)
- Romani: 1,168, representing 4.8% (in 1850: 2.7%)
- Germans (Transylvanian Saxons): 261, representing 1.1% (in 1850: 27.0%)
- Hungarians: 131, representing 0.5% (in 1850: 0.47%)
- Others: 52, representing 0.3%

From a confessional point of view, the majority of the inhabitants were Orthodox (80.1%), with a minority of Pentecostals (3.05%). For 11.58% of the population, the confessional affiliation was not known.

== Natives ==
- Iosif Blaga (1864–1937), literary theorist, aesthetician, priest, politician, and educator
- Lucian Blaga (1895–1961), philosopher, poet, playwright, poetry translator, and novelist
- Emil Bömches (1879–1969), sports shooter
- Mircea Breazu (born 1946), actor
- Anton Crișan (1942–2012), ice hockey player
- Carl Filtsch (1830–1845), pianist and composer
- Dan Găldean (born 1974), football player
- Johann Friedrich Geltch (1815–1851), Lutheran pastor and writer
- Sava Henția (1848–1904), painter, decorator and illustrator
- Friedrich Krasser (1818–1893), physician and writer
- Harald Krasser (1906–1981), writer and translator
- Georg Friedrich Marienburg (1820–1881), pastor, local historian, and linguist
- Vasile Moga (1774–1845), bishop of the Metropolitanate of Karlovci
- Radu Neguț (born 1981), football player
- Gheorghe Rășinaru (1915–1994), football player
- Viktor Roth (1874–1936), historian and pastor, honorary member of the Romanian Academy
- Simon Schobel (born 1950), handball player
- Viorel Sima (born 1950), football player
- Radu Stanca (1920–1962), writer
- Tataee (born 1976), record producer, rapper, and music manager
- Anneliese Thudt (1927–2018), dialect researcher and lexicographer

== Sister cities ==
- Komárno, Slovakia
- Komárom, Hungary
