= Sebeș (river) =

River in Sibiu and Alba, Romania

Sebeș Sebes, Mühlbach, Frumoasa
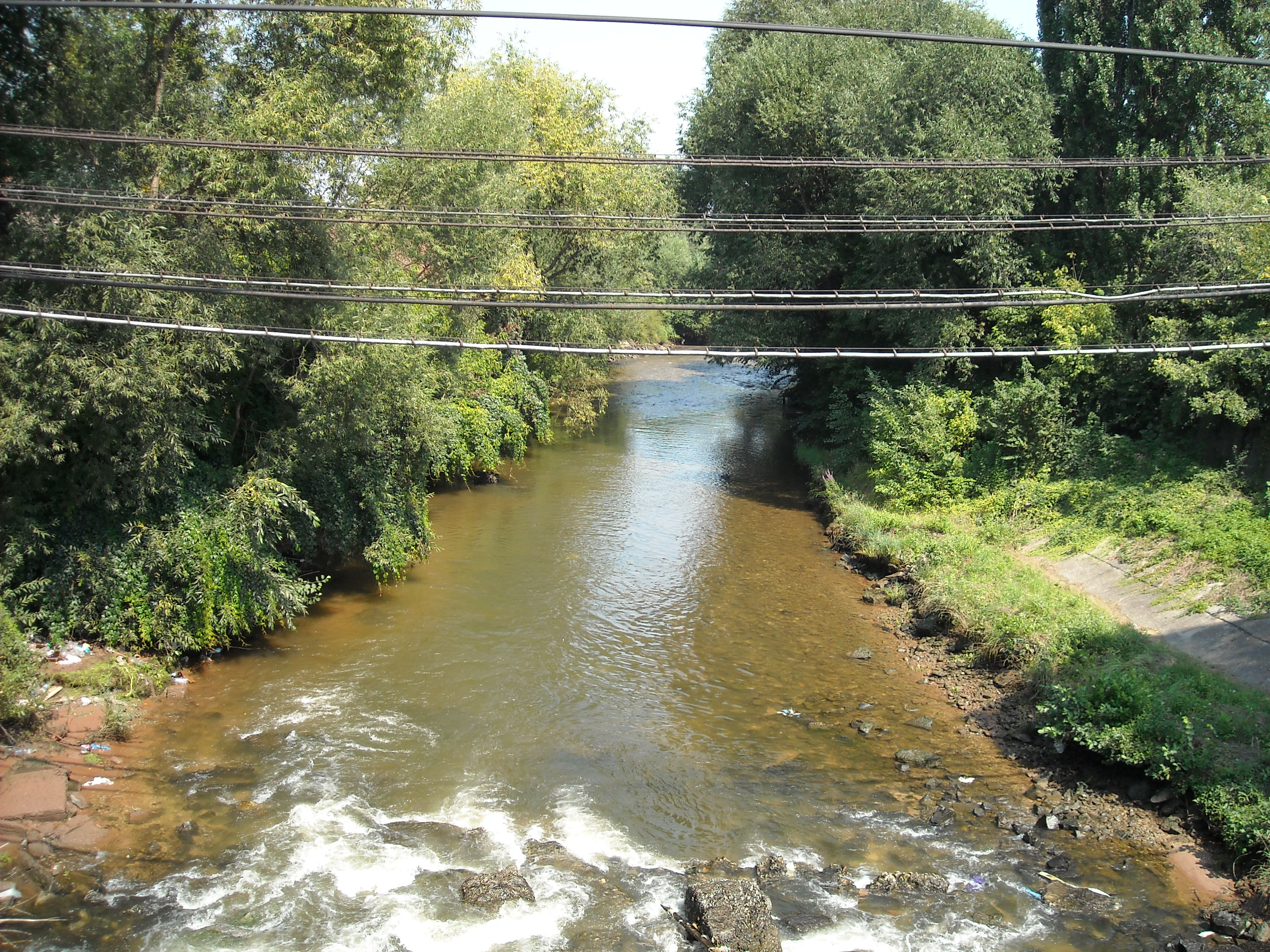

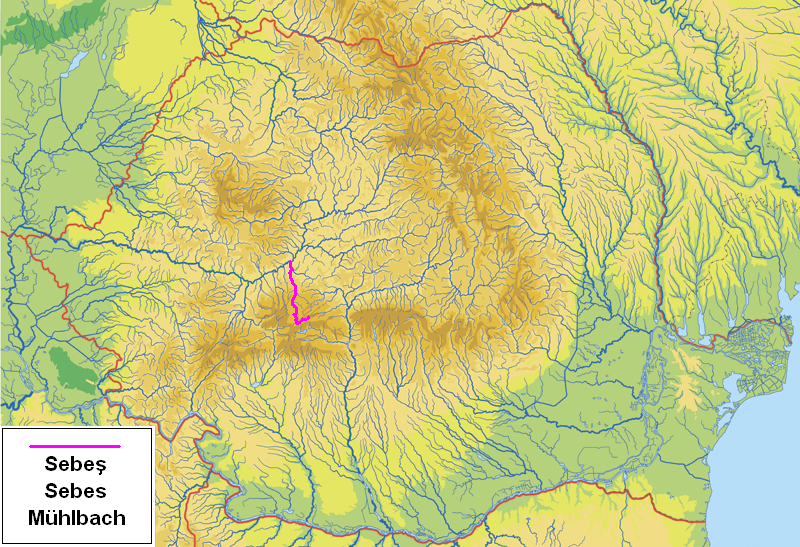

Location
- Country: Romania
- Counties: Sibiu, Alba
- Towns: Sebeș

Physical characteristics
- Source: Mount Cindrel
  - location: Cindrel Mountains
  - coordinates: 45°32′59″N 23°43′38″E
- Mouth: Mureș
  - location: Alba Iulia
  - coordinates: 46°02′25″N 23°33′32″E
  - elevation: 214 m (702 ft)
- Length: 96 km (60 mi)
- Basin size: 1,304 km^{2} (503 sq mi)
- Discharge
  - average: 9 m^{3}/s (320 cu ft/s)

Basin features
- Progression: Mureș→ Tisza→ Danube→ Black Sea
- Tributaries
  - left: Sălanele, Prigoana
  - right: Ciban, Dobra, Secaș

The Sebeș (Hungarian: Sebes, German: Mühlbach) is a left tributary of the river Mureș in Transylvania, Romania. The upper reach of the river (upstream of Lake Oașa) is also known as Frumoasa. The Romanian and Hungarian name Sebeș and Sebes originate from the Hungarian adjective sebes meaning "speedy", while the German name means Mill Creek. The source of the river is on the south slope of the Cindrel Mountains, in the southwestern part of Sibiu County. It flows through the reservoirs Oașa and Tău. It discharges into the Mureș in Oarda, near Alba Iulia. Its length is 96 km (60 mi) and its basin size is 1,304 km^{2} (503 sq mi).

== Towns and villages ==
The following towns and villages are situated along the river Sebeș, from source to mouth: Dobra, Șugag, Căpâlna, Laz, Săsciori, Sebeșel, Petrești, Sebeș, Lancrăm, Oarda.

== Tributaries ==
The following rivers are tributaries to the river Sebeș (from source to mouth):

- Left: Tărtărău, Sălanele, Valea Mare, Prigoana, Gâlceag, Miraș, Neagu, Groșești, Mărtinia
- Right: Curpăt, Ciban, Bistra, Dobra, Nedeiu, Secaș
