= Oașa Dam =

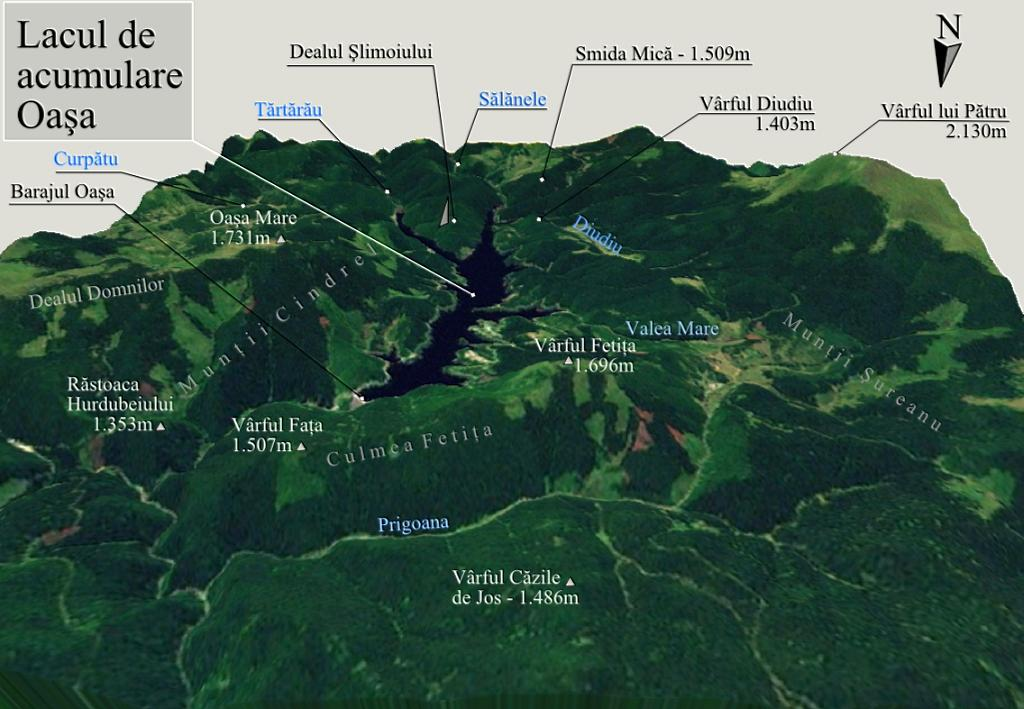
- Country: Romania
- Location: Alba County, Romania
- Coordinates: 45.588°N 23.628°E

Dam and spillways
- Impounds: Sebeș

Reservoir
- Total capacity: 136×10^{6} m^{3} (110,000 acre⋅ft)
- Surface area: 4.54 km^{2} (1.75 sq mi)

Oașa Dam is a large dam on the river Sebeș in Romania.

The project was started and finished in the 1980s and it was made up by the construction of a reinforced concrete facing rockfilled dam 91 m high.

The Gâlceag hydropower plant is equipped with two turbines, having an installed capacity of 150 MW.

The power station generates 260 GWh of electricity per year.
