= Apold (disambiguation) =

Apold or Apoldu may refer to several places in Romania:

- Apold, a commune in Mureș County
- Apoldu de Jos, a commune in Sibiu County
- Apoldu de Sus, a village in Miercurea Sibiului town, Sibiu County
- Apold (river)
