= Daia (disambiguation) =

Daia is a commune in Giurgiu County, Romania

It may also refer to:

== Places in Romania ==
- Daia (formerly Daia Secuiască), a village in Ulieș Commune, Harghita County
- Daia (formerly Sas-Daia), a village in Apold Commune, Mureș County
- Daia, a village in Bahnea Commune, Mureș County
- Daia (formerly Daia Săsească), a village in Roșia Commune, Sibiu County
- Daia Română, a commune in Alba County
- Daia, a tributary of the Hârtibaciu in Sibiu County
- Daia (Homorod), a tributary of the Homorodul Mare in Harghita County
- Daia (Secaș), in Alba County
- Daia, a tributary of the Târnava Mare in Mureș County

== People ==
- Maximinus II, also known as Maximinus Daia
- Daïa, 11th century Muslim saint

== Other ==
- Delegación de Asociaciones Israelitas Argentinas, umbrella organization of Argentina's Jewish community, usually shortened as DAIA
