= Amnaș =

- Location within Romania

Location
- Country: Romania
- Counties: Sibiu County
- Villages: Amnaș, Apoldu de Jos

Physical characteristics
- Mouth: Apold
  - location: Apoldu de Jos
  - coordinates: 45.8864°N 23.8468°E
- Length: 9 km (5.6 mi)
- Basin size: 34 km^{2} (13 sq mi)

Basin features
- Progression: Apold→ Secaș→ Sebeș→ Mureș→ Tisza→ Danube→ Black Sea

The Amnaș (Hungarian: Ecsellői-patak) is a right tributary of the river Apold in Romania. It flows into the Apold in Apoldu de Jos. Its length is 9 km (5.6 mi) and its basin size is 34 km^{2} (13 sq mi).
