= Gârbova (disambiguation) =

Gârbova may refer to the following places in Romania:

- Gârbova, a commune in southern Alba County
- Gârbova de Jos, a village in the municipality Aiud, northern Alba County
- Gârbova de Sus, a village in the municipality Aiud, northern Alba County
- Gârbova (Mureș), a river in northern Alba County
- Gârbova (Secaș), a river in Sibiu and Alba Counties
