= Miercurea Sibiului =

- Town
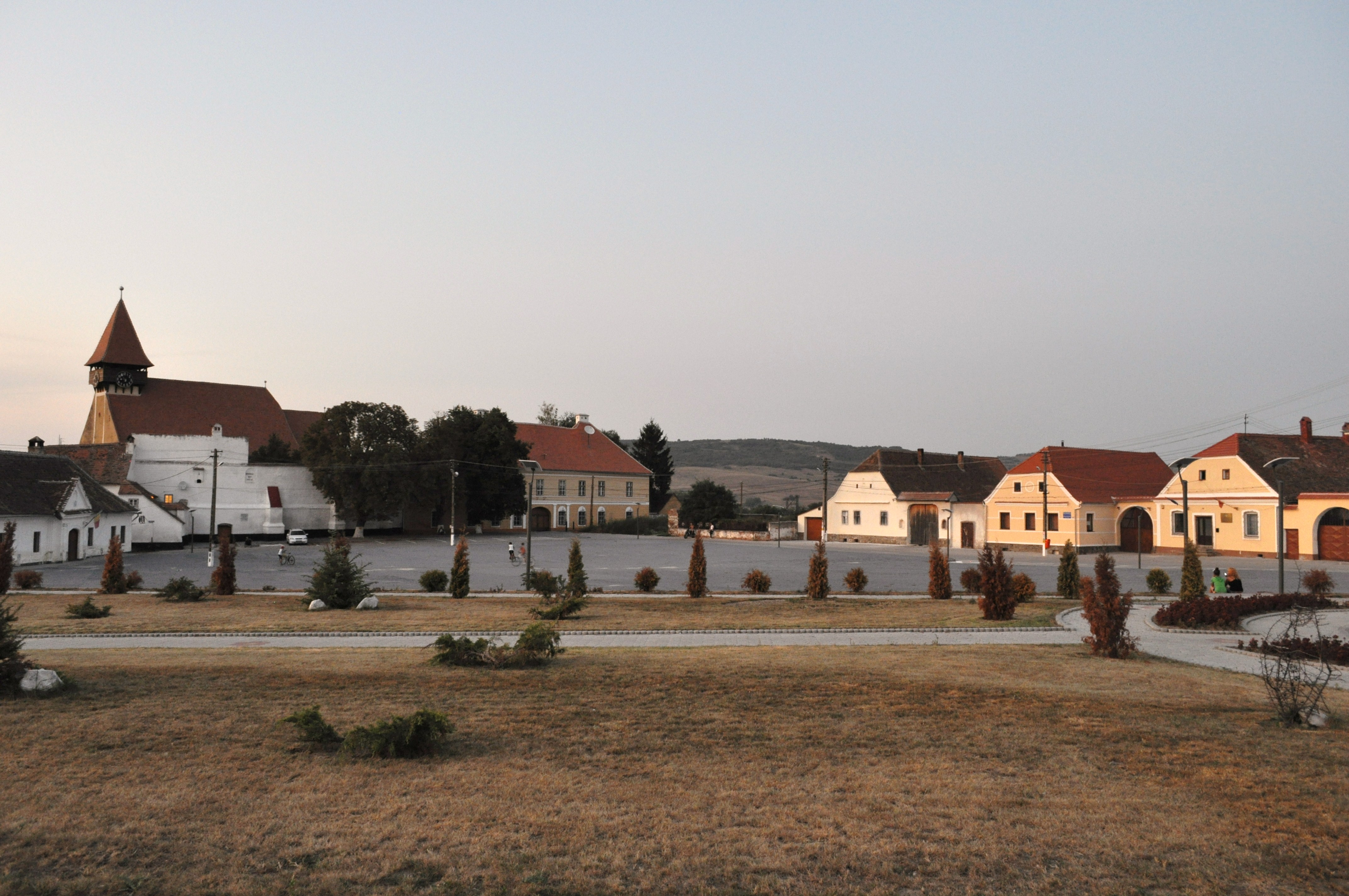
- Historical center of Miercurea Sibiului

- Coat of arms

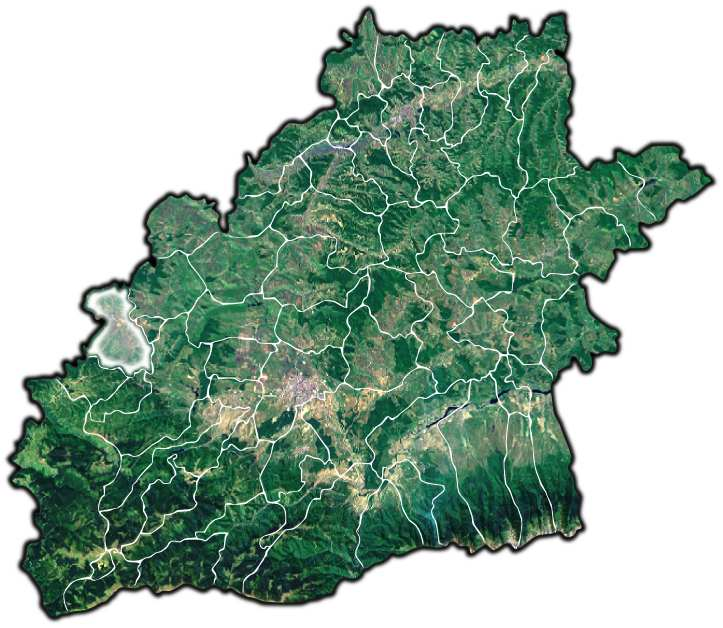
- Location in Sibiu County

- Location in Romania
- Coordinates: 45°53′N 23°47′E
- Country: Romania
- County: Sibiu

Government
  - Mayor (2024–2028): Ioan Troancă (PNL)
- Area: 85.12 km^{2} (32.87 sq mi)
- Elevation: 230 m (750 ft)
- Population (2021-12-01): 3,619
  - Density: 42.52/km^{2} (110.1/sq mi)
- Time zone: UTC+02:00 (EET)
  - Summer (DST): UTC+03:00 (EEST)
- Postal code: 557150
- Vehicle reg.: SB
- Website: www.miercureasibiului.ro

Miercurea Sibiului (German: Reußmarkt; Transylvanian Saxon: Ruzmargt; Hungarian: Szerdahely) is a town in the west of Sibiu County, in southern Transylvania, central Romania, 34 km (21 mi) to the west of the county capital, Sibiu.

== Administration ==
Miercurea Sibiului was declared a town in 2004. It is the 16th-smallest town in the country.

The town administers two villages:

- The village of Apoldu de Sus (Großpold; Nagyapold), 5 km (3.1 mi) away
- The village of Dobârca (Dobring; Doborka), 8 km (5.0 mi) away.

Also, 5 km away there is a small spa district, Băile Miercurea.

At the 2011 census, 83.1% of inhabitants were Romanians, 14.7% Roma, and 1.9% Germans.

== Geography ==
The town lies on the contact area between the Transylvanian Plateau and the Cindrel Mountains, a massif in the Parâng Mountains group in the Southern Carpathians, on a small depression formed by the Secaș River. The river Dobârca is a left tributary of the Secaș that flows through the eponymous village. The river Apold and its left tributary, the Rod, flow through the village of Apoldu de Sus.

Miercurea Sibiului has the following neighbors: to the north, the villages Boz, Drașov, and Cunța in Alba County; to the west, the villages Câlnic, Reciu, and Gârbova in Alba County; to the south, the communes Poiana Sibiului, Tilișca, and Jina in Sibiu County; and to the east, the village Aciliu and the commune Apoldu de Jos in Sibiu County.

The town is situated on a main Romanian road link: the DN1 road between Sibiu and Sebeș, E68/E81 European routes. Miercurea Sibiului is also situated on the national railroad (Căile Ferate Române) Line 200, which runs from Brașov to Curtici.

=== Apoldu de Sus ===
Apoldu de Sus village is administered by the town of Miercurea Sibiului. It had a population of 1290 at the 2021 census.

== History ==
The town was established in the 12th or 13th century by Transylvanian Saxons and from 1355 it became one of the original seven seats of the Saxon Sibiu county.

Historical population
Year	Pop.	±%
1850	1,371	—
1910	2,055	+49.9%
1941	2,065	+0.5%
1977	2,585	+25.2%
1992	2,021	−21.8%
2002	4,063	+101.0%
2011	3,792	−6.7%
2021	3,619	−4.6%
Source: Census data

== Education ==
There is one secondary school in Miercurea Sibiului: the Ilie Măcelariu Technological High School.

== Notable people ==
In chronological order:

- Ilie Măcelaru (1822–1891), born here, a lawyer who participated in the 1848 revolution and a founding member of the Romanian National Party that was formed in Miercurea Sibiului on 17 March 1869.
- Cornel Medrea (1888–1964), sculptor
- Victor Precup (1889–1958), military officer
- Victor Capesius (1907–1985), Nazi SS-Sturmbannführer at Dachau and Auschwitz
- Johann Jungwirth (b. 1973), engineer

== Image gallery ==
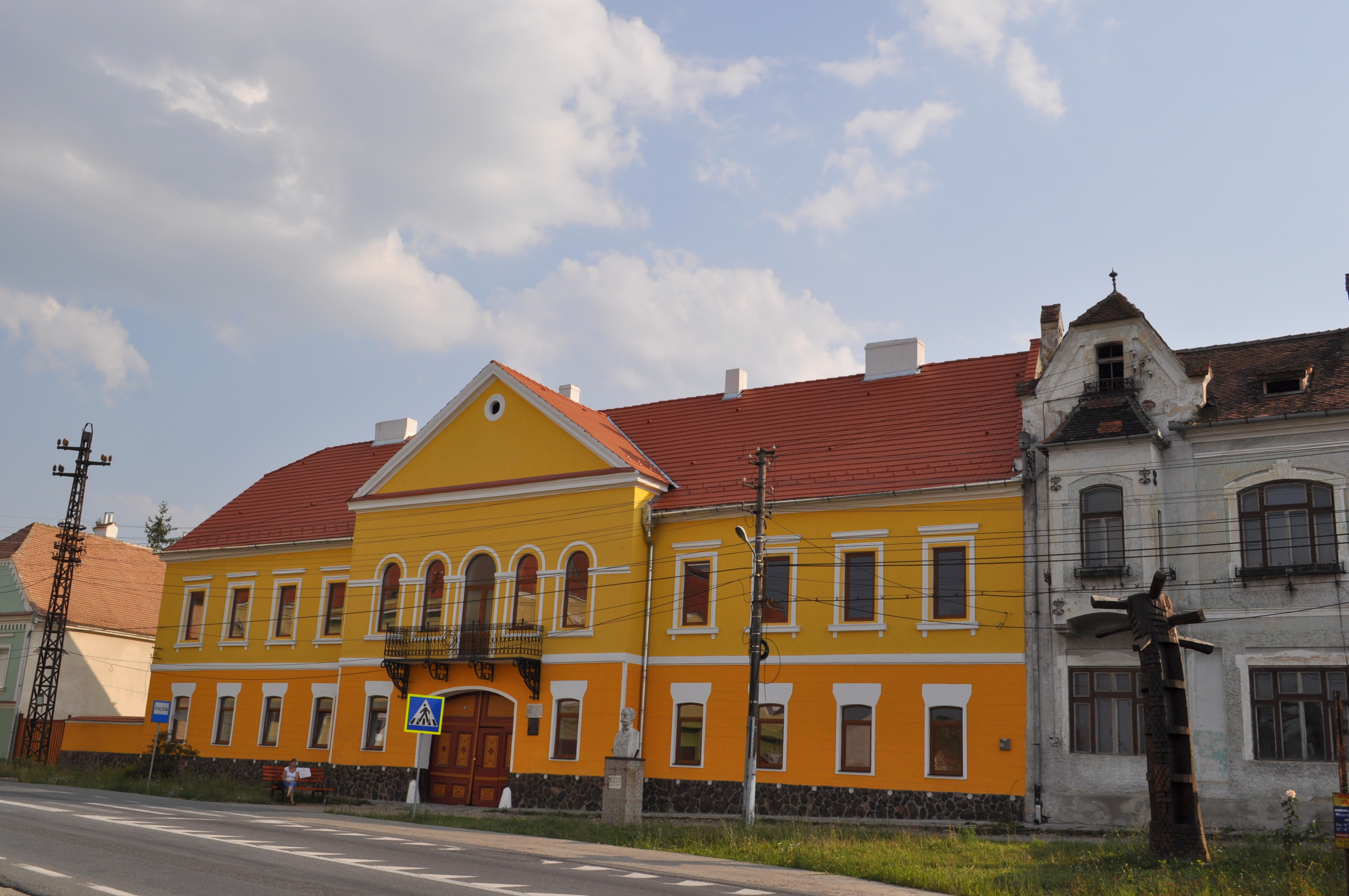
Historical building in Miercurea Sibiului

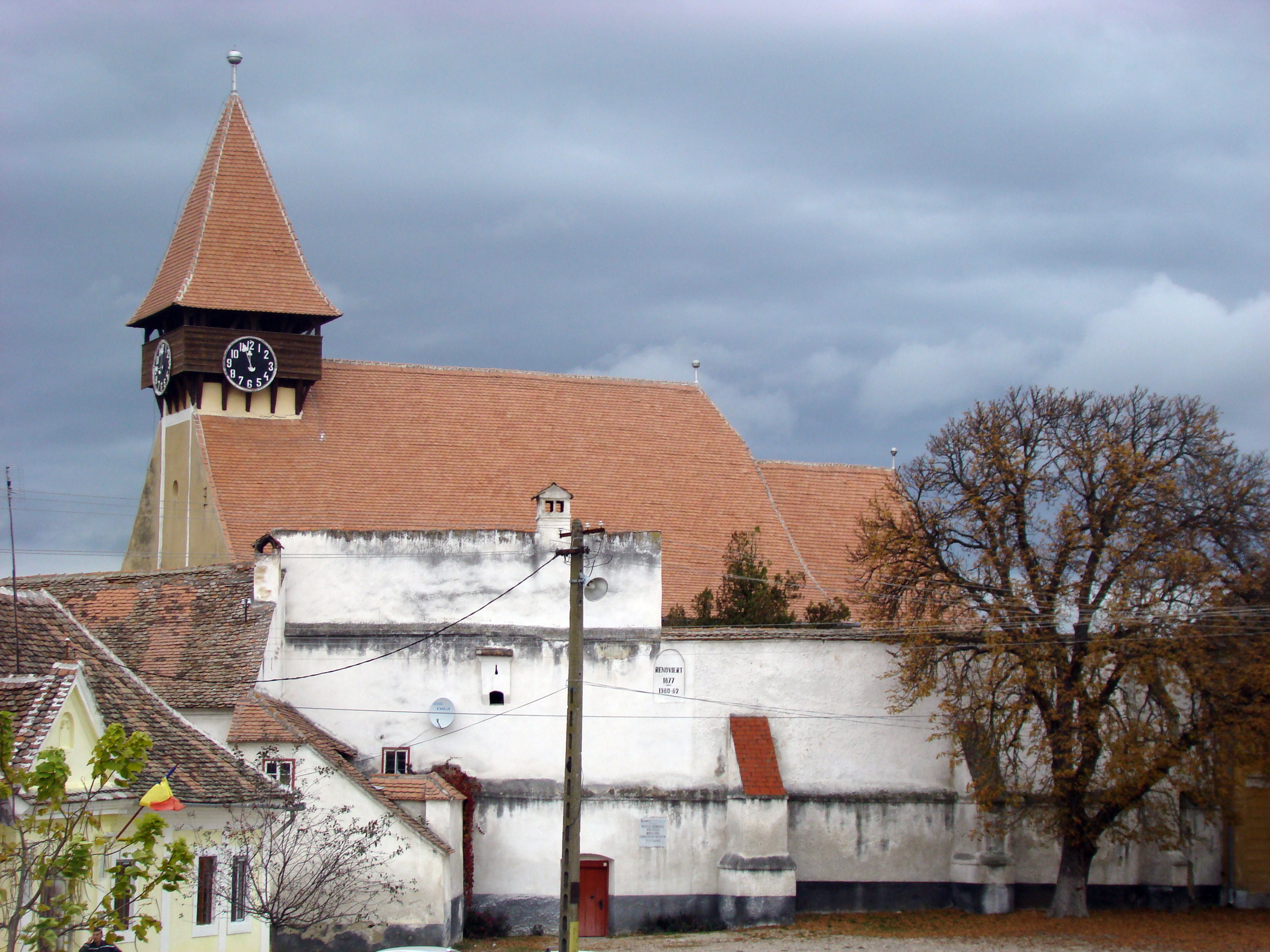
The fortified church of Miercurea Sibiului

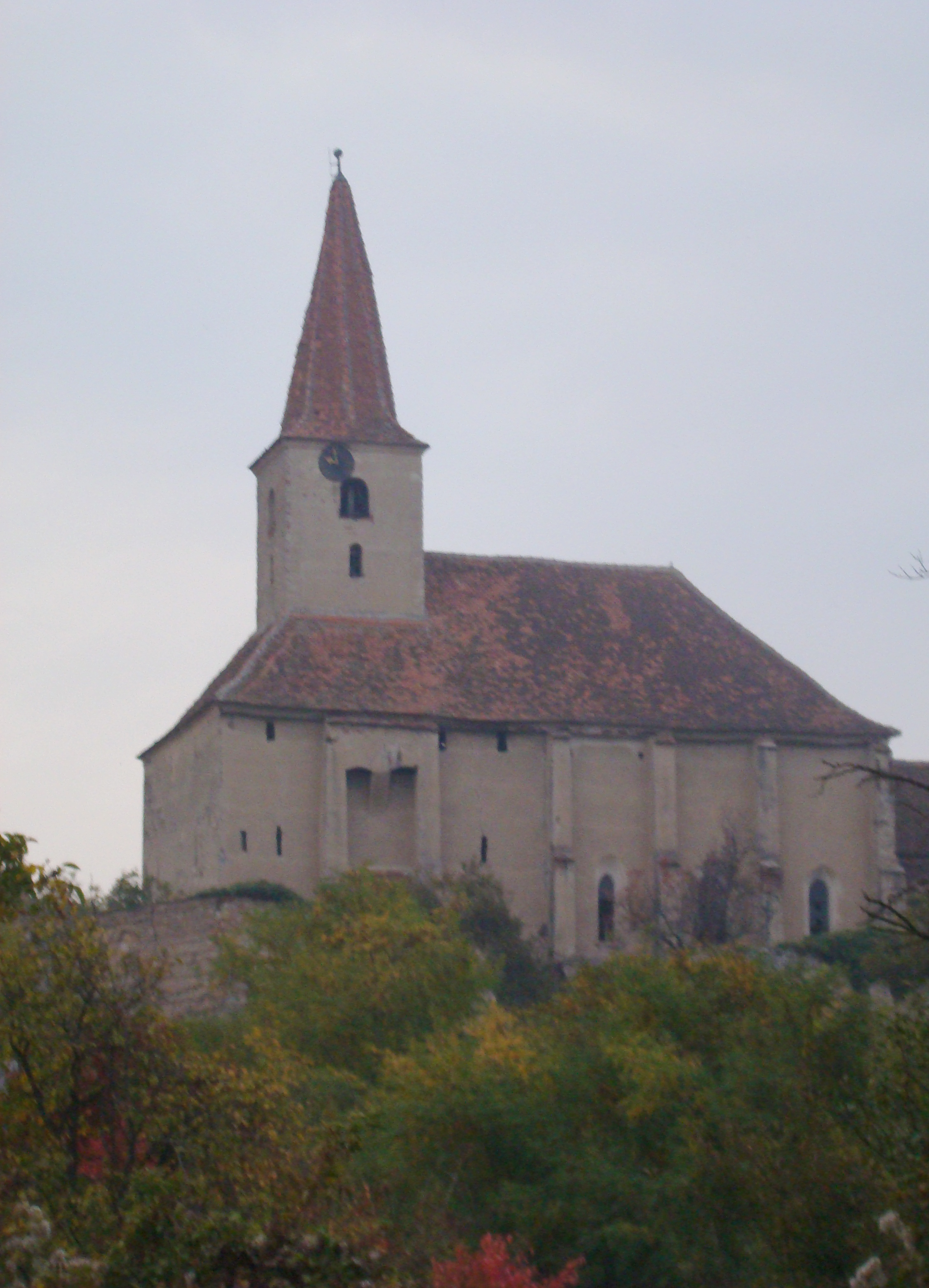
The fortified church of Dobârca

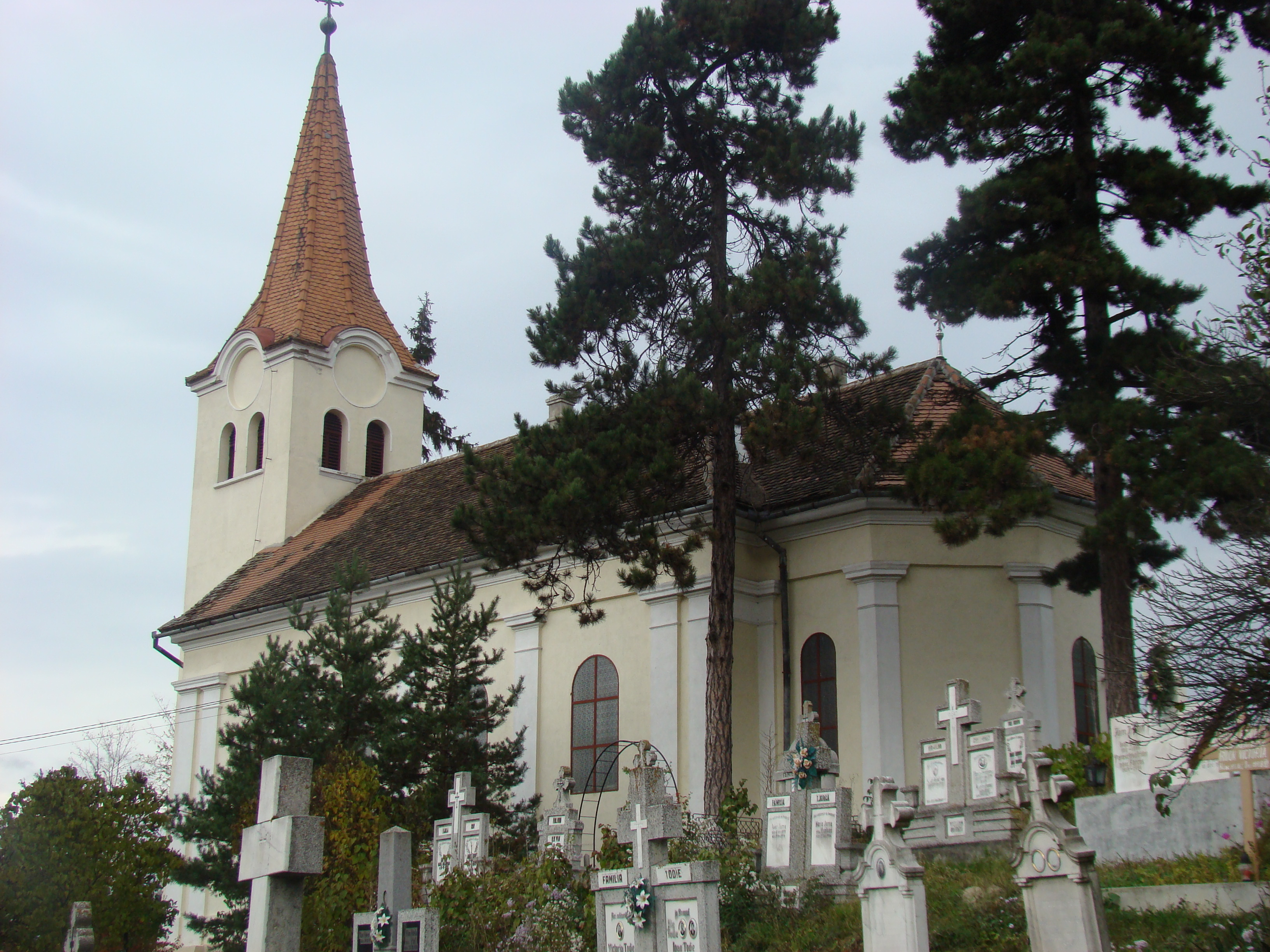
Orthodox church in Apoldu de Sus
