= Câlnic =

Câlnic or Calnic may refer to several places in Romania:

- Câlnic, Alba, a commune in Alba County
- Câlnic, Gorj, a commune in Gorj County
- Câlnic, a district in the city of Reșița, Caraș-Severin County
- Calnic, a village in Valea Crișului Commune, Covasna County
- Câlnic (Secaș), a river in Alba County
- Câlnic (Gilort), a river in Gorj County
- Câlnic, a tributary of the Tismana in Gorj County
