= Șpring (river) =

- Location within Romania

Location
- Country: Romania
- Counties: Alba County
- Villages: Șpring, Drașov

Physical characteristics
- Mouth: Boz
  - coordinates: 45.9348°N 23.7483°E
- Length: 8 km (5.0 mi)
- Basin size: 58 km^{2} (22 sq mi)

Basin features
- Progression: Boz→ Secaș→ Sebeș→ Mureș→ Tisza→ Danube→ Black Sea
- Tributaries
  - right: Vingard, Drașov

The Șpring is a right tributary of the river Boz in Romania. It flows into the Boz in Drașov. Its length is 8 km (5.0 mi) and its basin size is 58 km^{2} (22 sq mi).
