= Daia Română =

- Commune
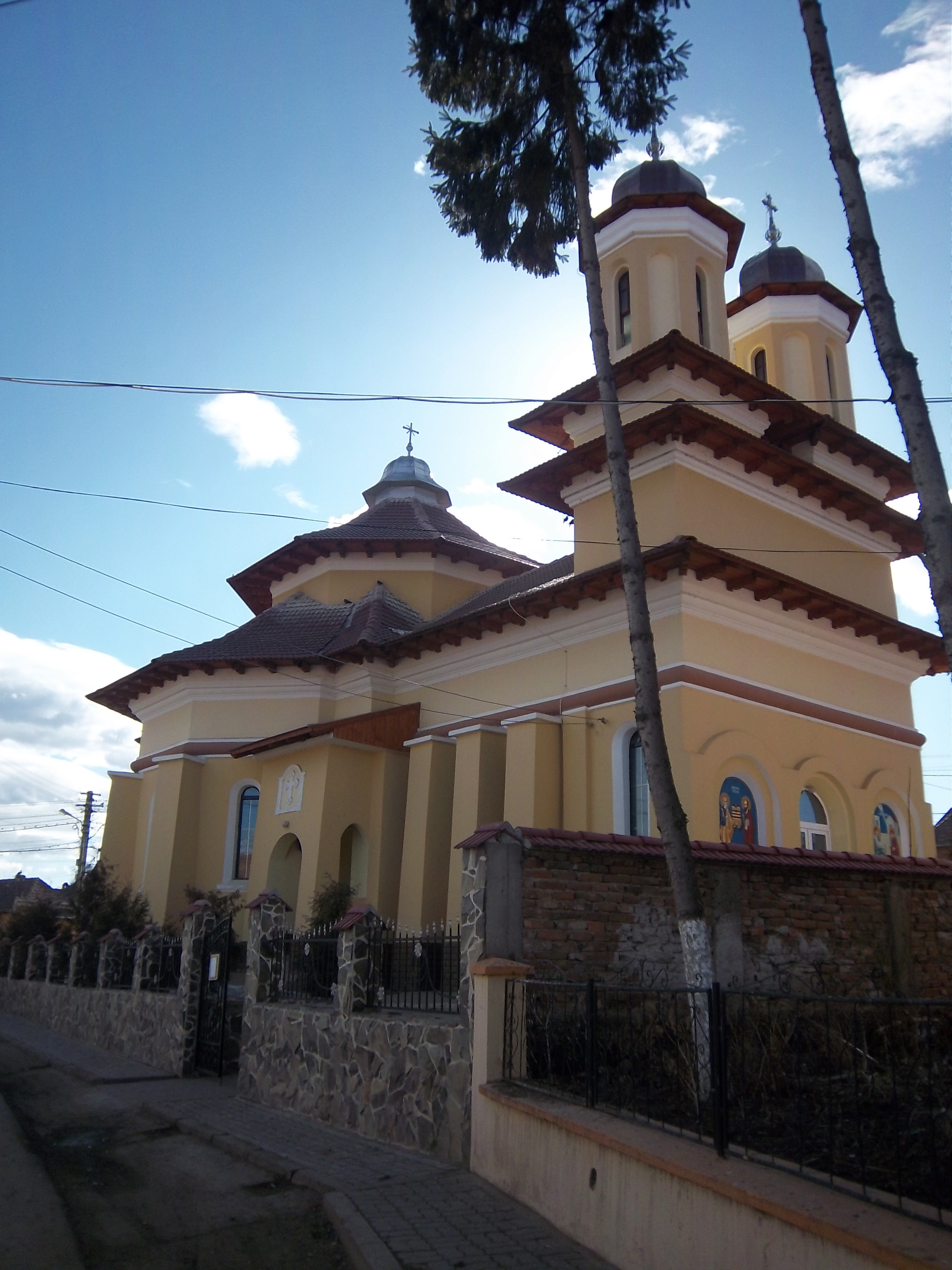
- Church in Daia Română

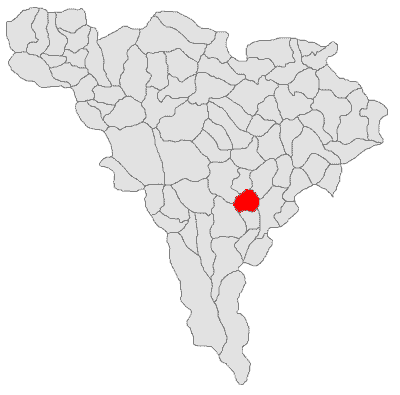
- Location in Alba County

- Location in Romania
- Coordinates: 46°00′25″N 23°40′05″E
- Country: Romania
- County: Alba

Government
  - Mayor (2020–2024): Visarion Hăprian (PNL)
- Area: 46.43 km^{2} (17.93 sq mi)
- Elevation: 302 m (991 ft)
- Highest elevation: 315 m (1,033 ft)
- Lowest elevation: 90 m (300 ft)
- Population (2021-12-01): 3,051
  - Density: 65.71/km^{2} (170.2/sq mi)
- Time zone: UTC+02:00 (EET)
  - Summer (DST): UTC+03:00 (EEST)
- Postal code: 517270
- Area code: (+40) 02 58
- Vehicle reg.: AB
- Website: primariadaiaromana.ro

Daia Română (German: Dallendorf, Luprechttal; Hungarian: Oláhdálya, Dálya) is a commune located in the southeastern part of Alba County, Transylvania, Romania. As of 2021, it has a population of 3,051. It is composed of a single village, Daia Română.

The commune is situated on the Transylvanian Plateau, 10.5 km (6.5 mi) northeast of Sebeș, and 18 km (11 mi) southeast of the county seat, Alba Iulia. The river Daia flows through the commune.

Daia Română borders Berghin commune to the north and northeast, Șpring commune to the east and southeast, Cut commune to the south, the city of Sebeș to the southwest, the city of Alba Iulia to the west, and Ciugud commune to the north.
