= Gyertyános =

Gyertyános is the Hungarian name for two villages in Romania:

- Carpenii de Sus village, Șpring Commune, Alba County
- Cărpiniș village, Simeria Town, Hunedoara County
