= Câlnău =

Câlnău may refer to several rivers in Romania:

- Câlnău (Dâmbovița), a tributary of the Dâmbovița
- Câlnău (Buzău), a tributary of the Buzău

== See also ==
- Câlnic (disambiguation)
