= Rod (river) =

- Location within Romania

Location
- Country: Romania
- Counties: Sibiu County
- Villages: Rod

Physical characteristics
- Mouth: Apold
  - coordinates: 45.8565°N 23.8363°E
- Length: 12 km (7.5 mi)
- Basin size: 22 km^{2} (8.5 sq mi)

Basin features
- Progression: Apold→ Secaș→ Sebeș→ Mureș→ Tisza→ Danube→ Black Sea
- Tributaries
  - left: Valea Poienii

The Rod is a left tributary of the river Apold in Romania. It flows into the Apold in Apoldu de Sus. Its length is 12 km (7.5 mi) and its basin size is 22 km^{2} (8.5 sq mi).
