= Kerpenyes =

Kerpenyes is the Hungarian name for two villages in Romania:

- Cărpiniş village, Gârbova Commune, Alba County
- Cărpiniş village, Tărlungeni Commune, Braşov County
