= Boz (Secaș) =

- Location within Romania

Location
- Country: Romania
- Counties: Alba County
- Villages: Doștat, Boz

Physical characteristics
- Mouth: Secaș
  - location: Cunța
  - coordinates: 45.9307°N 23.7231°E
- Length: 11 km (6.8 mi)
- Basin size: 107 km^{2} (41 sq mi)

Basin features
- Progression: Secaș→ Sebeș→ Mureș→ Tisza→ Danube→ Black Sea
- Tributaries
  - right: Șpring

The Boz is a right tributary of the river Secaș in Romania. It discharges into the Secaș in Cunța, near Drașov. Its length is 11 km (6.8 mi) and its basin size is 107 km^{2} (41 sq mi).
