= Dobârca =

- Location within Romania

Location
- Country: Romania
- Counties: Sibiu County
- Villages: Dobârca

Physical characteristics
- Mouth: Secaș
  - coordinates: 45.8951°N 23.8019°E
- Length: 11 km (6.8 mi)
- Basin size: 20 km^{2} (7.7 sq mi)

Basin features
- Progression: Secaș→ Sebeș→ Mureș→ Tisza→ Danube→ Black Sea

The Dobârca is a left tributary of the river Secaș in Romania. It flows into the Secaș in Miercurea Sibiului. Its length is 11 km (6.8 mi) and its basin size is 20 km^{2} (7.7 sq mi).
