= Câlnic (Secaș) =

- Location within Romania

Location
- Country: Romania
- Counties: Alba County

Physical characteristics
- Mouth: Secaș
  - location: Câlnic
  - coordinates: 45.9302°N 23.7129°E
- Length: 13 km (8.1 mi)
- Basin size: 32 km^{2} (12 sq mi)

Basin features
- Progression: Secaș→ Sebeș→ Mureș→ Tisza→ Danube→ Black Sea

The Câlnic is a left tributary of the river Secaș in Romania. It discharges into the Secaș in Cunța. It flows through the village Câlnic. Its length is 13 km (8.1 mi) and its basin size is 32 km^{2} (12 sq mi).
