= Gârbova (Secaș) =

- Location within Romania

Location
- Country: Romania
- Counties: Sibiu, Alba
- Villages: Gârbova

Physical characteristics
- Mouth: Secaș
  - location: Miercurea Sibiului
  - coordinates: 45.9045°N 23.7799°E

Basin features
- Progression: Secaș→ Sebeș→ Mureș→ Tisza→ Danube→ Black Sea
- Tributaries
  - left: Chipeșa, Reciu

The Gârbova is a left tributary of the river Secaș in Romania. It discharges into the Secaș in Miercurea Sibiului. Its length is 17 km (11 mi) and its basin size is 66 km^{2} (25 sq mi).
