= Apold (river) =

River in Sibiu, Romania

- Location within Romania

Location
- Country: Romania
- Counties: Sibiu County
- Villages: Apoldu de Sus, Apoldu de Jos

Physical characteristics
- Mouth: Secaș
  - location: Apoldu de Jos
  - coordinates: 45.8911°N 23.8454°E
- Length: 13 km (8.1 mi)
- Basin size: 86 km^{2} (33 sq mi)

Basin features
- Progression: Secaș→ Sebeș→ Mureș→ Tisza→ Danube→ Black Sea
- Tributaries
  - left: Rod
  - right: Amnaș

The Apold (Hungarian: Nagyapoldi-patak) is a left tributary of the river Secaș in Romania. It discharges into the Secaș in Apoldu de Jos. Its length is 13 km (8.1 mi) and its basin size is 86 km^{2} (33 sq mi).
