= Ciugud =

- Commune
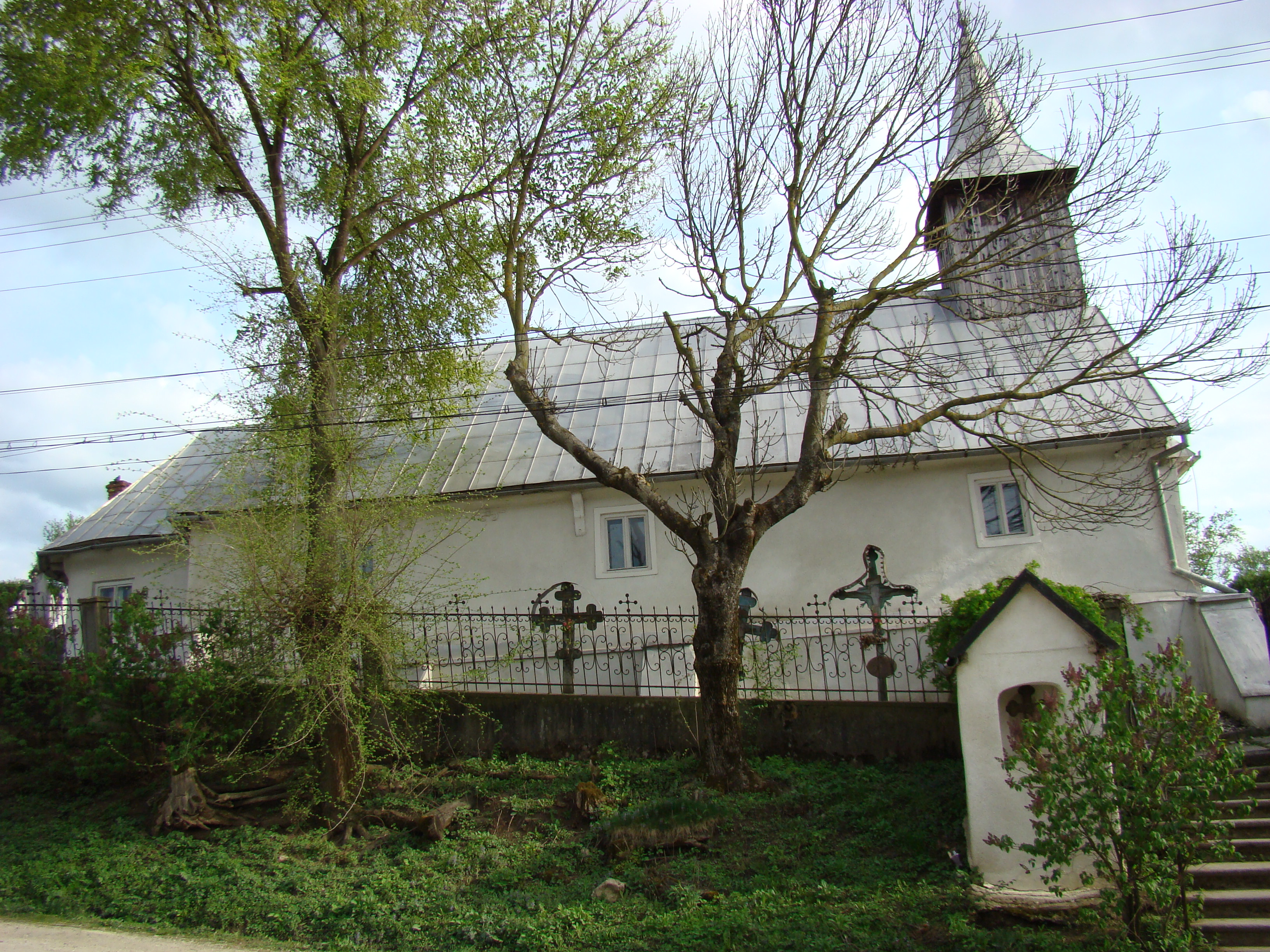
- Wooden church in Drâmbar

- Seal

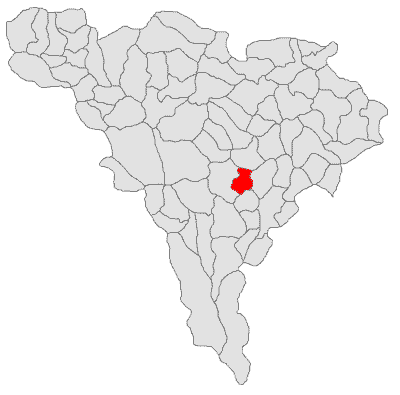
- Location in Alba County

- Location in Romania
- Coordinates: 46°03′N 23°37′E
- Country: Romania
- County: Alba

Government
  - Mayor (2020–2024): Gheorghe Dămian (Ind.)
- Area: 43.91 km^{2} (16.95 sq mi)
- Elevation: 231 m (758 ft)
- Population (2021-12-01): 3,285
  - Density: 74.81/km^{2} (193.8/sq mi)
- Time zone: UTC+02:00 (EET)
  - Summer (DST): UTC+03:00 (EEST)
- Postal code: 517240
- Area code: +(40) 258
- Vehicle reg.: AB
- Website: www.primariaciugud.ro

Ciugud (Hungarian: Maroscsüged; German: Schenkendorf) is a commune located in the central part of Alba County, Transylvania, Romania. It is composed of six villages: Ciugud, Drâmbar (Drombár), Hăpria (Oláhherepe), Șeușa (Sóspatak), Teleac (Újcsongvaitelep), and Limba (Dumbrava from 1960 to 2004; Lombfalva).

== Geography ==
The commune is situated on the Transylvanian Plateau, on the left bank of the Mureș River, across from the county seat, Alba Iulia. It borders Sântimbru and Berghin communes to the north, Oarda de Jos village to the south, the city of Alba Iulia to the west, and Daia Română commune to the east. The administrative center of the commune is in Ciugud village, which is 9 km (5.6 mi) from the center of Alba Iulia, on county roads DJ 107C and DJ 107.

== Demographics ==
Historical population
Year	Pop.	±%
1850	2,922	—
1900	3,710	+27.0%
1930	4,483	+20.8%
1966	3,355	−25.2%
2002	2,664	−20.6%
2011	3,048	+14.4%
2021	3,285	+7.8%
Source: INS, Census data

At the census from 2011 there were 3,048 people living in this commune, of which 96.49% were ethnic Romanians. At the 2021 census, Ciugud had a population of 3,285; of those, 93.7% were Romanians.

== Natives ==
- Nicolae Giosan (1921–1990), agricultural engineer and communist politician

== Golf course ==
The Theodora Golf Club is located in Ciugud. Inaugurated in 2017, it is a par 6 course; with a length of 735 m (2,411 ft), it is one of the longest golf courses in Europe.
