= Daia (Secaș) =

- Location within Romania

Location
- Country: Romania
- Counties: Alba County
- Villages: Daia Română

Physical characteristics
- Mouth: Secaș
  - location: Sebeș
  - coordinates: 45.9656°N 23.5924°E
- Length: 11 km (6.8 mi)
- Basin size: 63 km^{2} (24 sq mi)

Basin features
- Progression: Secaș→ Sebeș→ Mureș→ Tisza→ Danube→ Black Sea

The Daia is a right tributary of the river Secaș in Romania. It flows into the Secaș near the city Sebeș. Its length is 11 km (6.8 mi) and its basin size is 63 km^{2} (24 sq mi).
