= Secaș (Sebeș) =

River in Sibiu and Alba, Romania

- Location within Romania

Location
- Country: Romania
- Counties: Sibiu, Alba
- Villages: Ludoș, Apoldu de Jos, Miercurea Sibiului, Cunța, Cut

Physical characteristics
- Mouth: Sebeș
  - location: Downstream of Lancrăm
  - coordinates: 45.9998°N 23.5624°E
- Length: 42 km (26 mi)
- Basin size: 581 km^{2} (224 sq mi)

Basin features
- Progression: Sebeș→ Mureș→ Tisza→ Danube→ Black Sea

The Secaș (also: Secașul Mare, Hungarian: Székás) is a right tributary of the river Sebeș in Romania. It discharges into the Sebeș in Lancrăm. Its length is 42 km (26 mi) and its basin size is 581 km^{2} (224 sq mi).

== Tributaries ==
The following rivers are tributaries to the river Secaș (from source to mouth):

- Left: Ludoș, Apold, Dobârca, Pustia, Gârbova, Câlnic
- Right: Sângătin, Boz, Daia
