= Cut, Alba =

Cut
- Commune
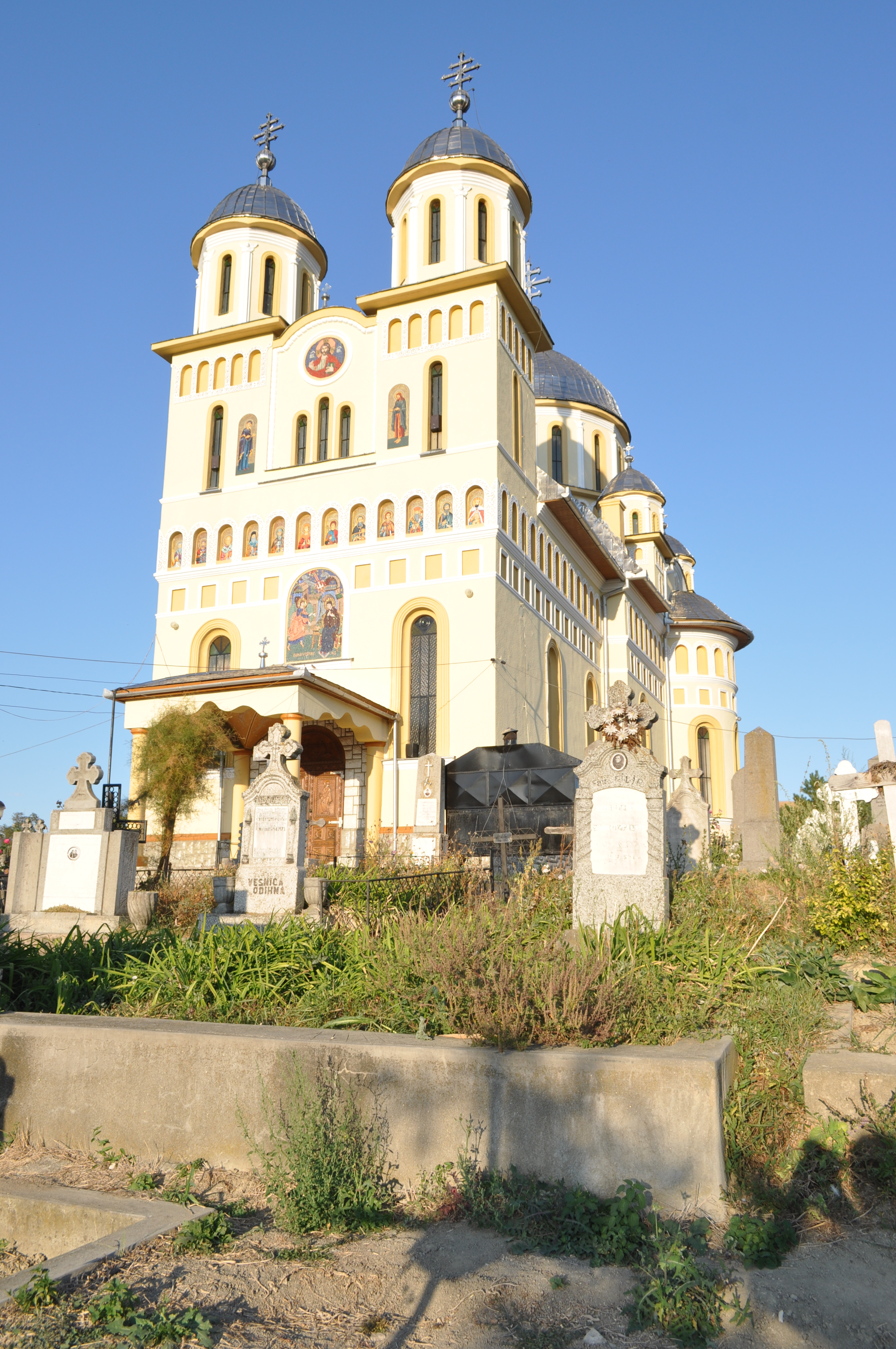
- Orthodox church in Cut

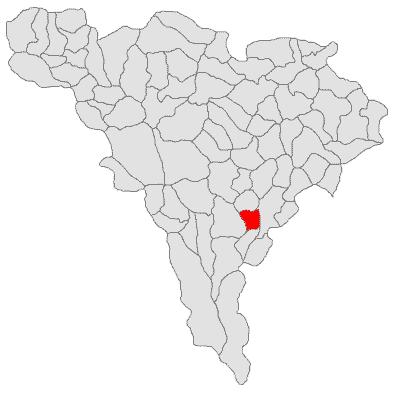
- Location in Alba County

- Location in Romania
- Coordinates: 45°56′N 23°40′E
- Country: Romania
- County: Alba

Government
  - Mayor (2020–2024): Sorin-Gheorghe Bâscă (PNL)
- Area: 30.8 km^{2} (11.9 sq mi)
- Elevation: 284 m (932 ft)
- Population (2021-12-01): 1,054
  - Density: 34.2/km^{2} (88.6/sq mi)
- Time zone: UTC+02:00 (EET)
  - Summer (DST): UTC+03:00 (EEST)
- Postal code: 517206
- Vehicle reg.: AB
- Website: www.comunacut.ro

Cut (German: Kokt, Quellendorf; Hungarian: Kútfalva) is a commune located in the southeastern part of Alba County, Transylvania, Romania. It is composed of a single village, Cut.

The commune is situated on the Secașelor Plateau, in the southwestern part of the Transylvanian Plateau. It is located in the south-central part of Alba County, about 10 km (6.2 mi) southeast of Sebeș and 14 km (8.7 mi) northwest of Miercurea Sibiului. Cut was first attested in 1291, under the name terra Kut.

The commune has a railway station that serves the CFR Line 200.

At the 2021 census, Cut had a population of 1,054. According to the census from 2011, there was a total population of 1,075 people living in this commune, of which 97.3% were ethnic Romanians and 1.58% were ethnic Romani.

Septimiu Albini (1861–1919) spent his childhood in Cut, where his family originated from. The primary school in Cut is named after Albini and features a medallion with his likeness, while a statue of him stands before the mayor's office.
