= Gârbova =

- Commune
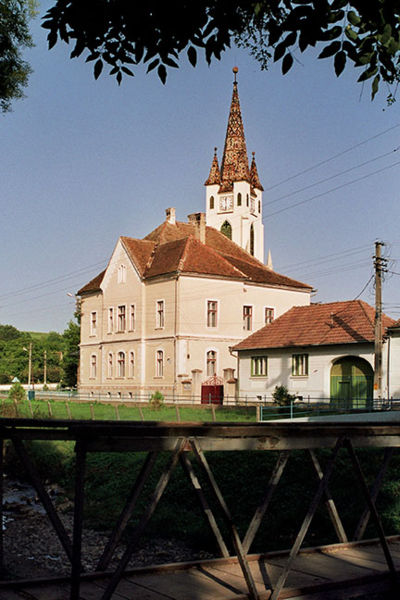
- Church in Gârbova

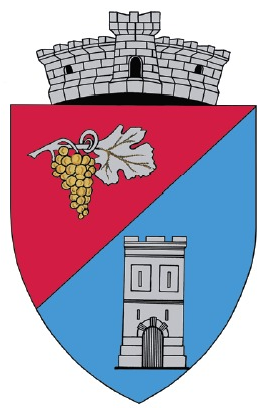
- Coat of arms

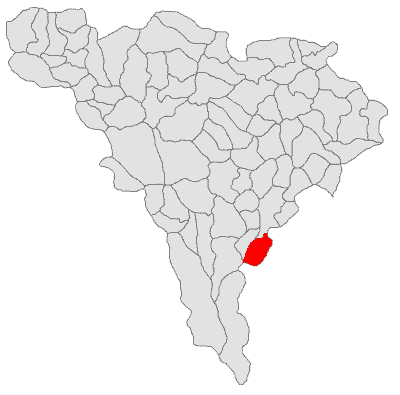
- Location in Alba County

- Location in Romania
- Coordinates: 45°52′N 23°44′E
- Country: Romania
- County: Alba

Government
  - Mayor (2020–2024): Ioan Muntean (PSD)
- Area: 58.94 km^{2} (22.76 sq mi)
- Elevation: 394 m (1,293 ft)
- Population (2021-12-01): 1,867
  - Density: 31.68/km^{2} (82.04/sq mi)
- Time zone: UTC+02:00 (EET)
  - Summer (DST): UTC+03:00 (EEST)
- Postal code: 517305
- Area code: (+40) 02 58
- Vehicle reg.: AB
- Website: www.primaria-garbova.ro

Gârbova (German: Urwegen; Hungarian: Szászorbó) is a commune located in Alba County, Transylvania, Romania. It has a population of 1,867 as of 2021 and is composed of three villages: Cărpiniș (Keppelsbach; Kerpenyes), Gârbova, and Reciu (Rätsch; Szebenrécse).

The commune is located in the southeastern part of the county, on the border with Sibiu County. The river Gârbova flows through the commune.

On a hill above Gârbova lie the ruins of a Romanesque basilica. Built in 1280, it served as a church until Christmas Day, 1870, when a fire destroyed the roof and damaged much of the structure.

Historical population
Year	Pop.	±%
1850	2,906	—
1930	3,729	+28.3%
1956	3,647	−2.2%
1977	3,241	−11.1%
1992	2,067	−36.2%
2002	2,059	−0.4%
2011	2,050	−0.4%
2021	1,867	−8.9%
Source: INS, Census data
