= Câlnic, Alba =

Câlnic
- Commune
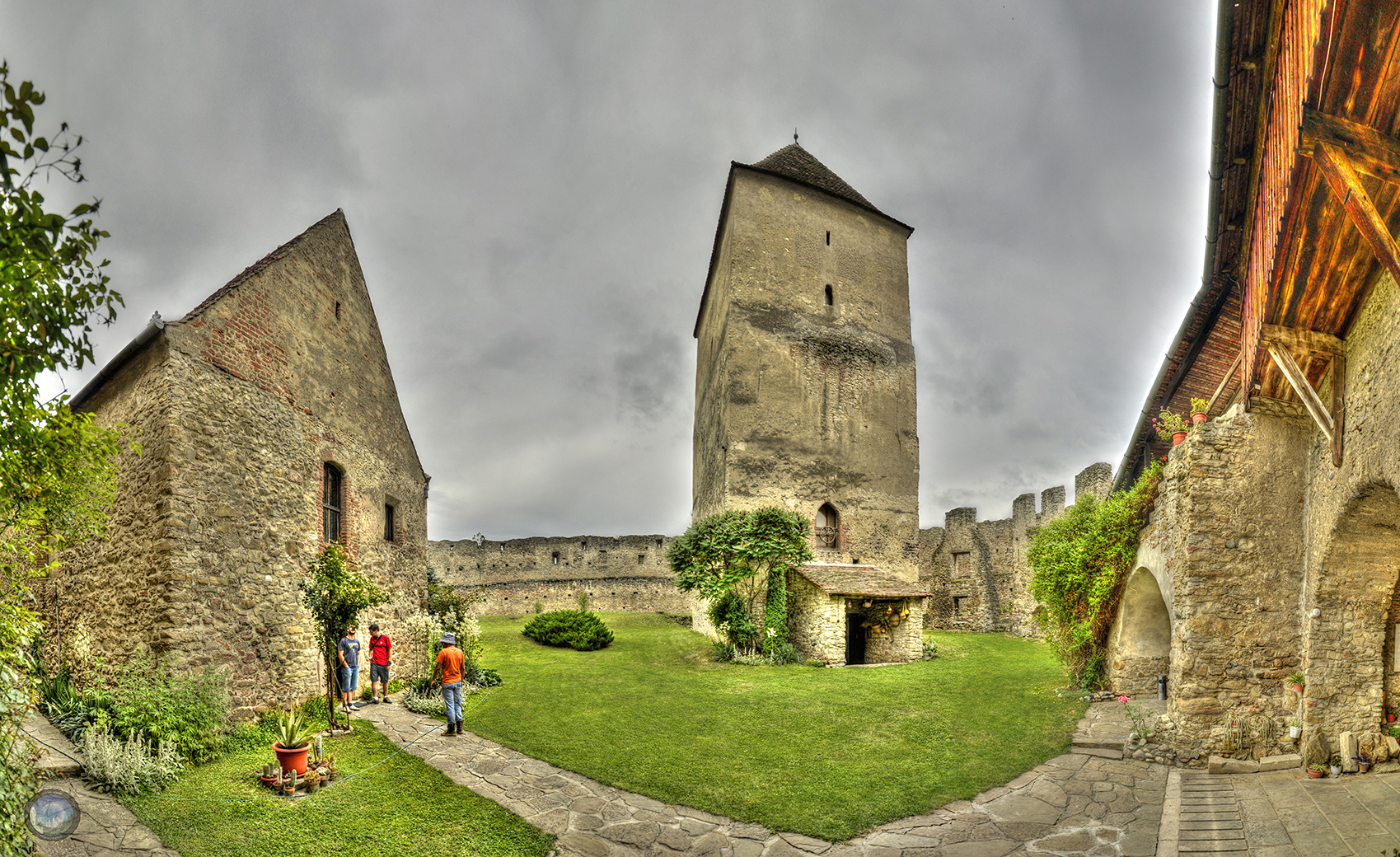
- Câlnic Citadel

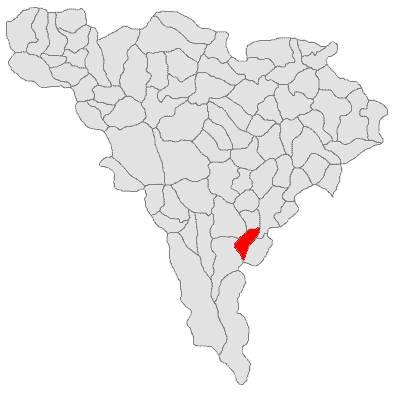
- Location in Alba County

- Location in Romania
- Coordinates: 45°53′10″N 23°39′11″E
- Country: Romania
- County: Alba

Government
  - Mayor (2024–2028): Lucian-Tiberiu Bodea (PNL)
- Area: 43.99 km^{2} (16.98 sq mi)
- Elevation: 344 m (1,129 ft)
- Population (2021-12-01): 1,810
  - Density: 41.1/km^{2} (107/sq mi)
- Time zone: UTC+02:00 (EET)
  - Summer (DST): UTC+03:00 (EEST)
- Postal code: 517205
- Area code: +(40) 0258
- Vehicle reg.: AB
- Website: primaria-calnic.ro

Câlnic (German: Kelling; Hungarian/Turkish: Kelnek) is a commune in Alba County, Transylvania, Romania, composed of two villages, Câlnic and Deal (Dál). Câlnic village is known for its castle, which is on UNESCO's list of World Heritage Sites.

== The castle ==
Câlnic Castle, first mentioned in 1269, is very well preserved. Built as a defensible residence for the local Saxon "Gref" or count, it was bought in 1430 by the likewise Saxon village community and further fortified as a refuge castle or Fliehburg. It consists of a large court surrounded by walls and some buildings adjacent to the walls. In the middle of the court there is a large keep as well as a chapel. The castle differs from most other constructions of this type in that it is not situated on a hilltop but rather in a depression, much lower than the surrounding hills. This position, clearly inconvenient in case of a siege, can be explained by the castle's first function as a residence, not meant as a defensive construction.

Historical population
Year	Pop.	±%
1850	2,023	—
1900	2,612	+29.1%
1941	2,821	+8.0%
1977	2,345	−16.9%
1992	1,724	−26.5%
2002	1,753	+1.7%
2011	1,681	−4.1%
2021	1,810	+7.7%
Source: INS, Census data

== See also ==
- List of castles in Romania
- Tourism in Romania
- Villages with fortified churches in Transylvania

== Bibliography ==
- Liviu Stoica, Gheorghe Stoica, Gabriela Popa - Castles & fortresses in Transylvania: Alba County / Castele și cetăți din Transilvania: Județul Alba, Cluj-Napoca, 2009, ISBN 978-973-0-06141-3
