= Șpring =

- Commune
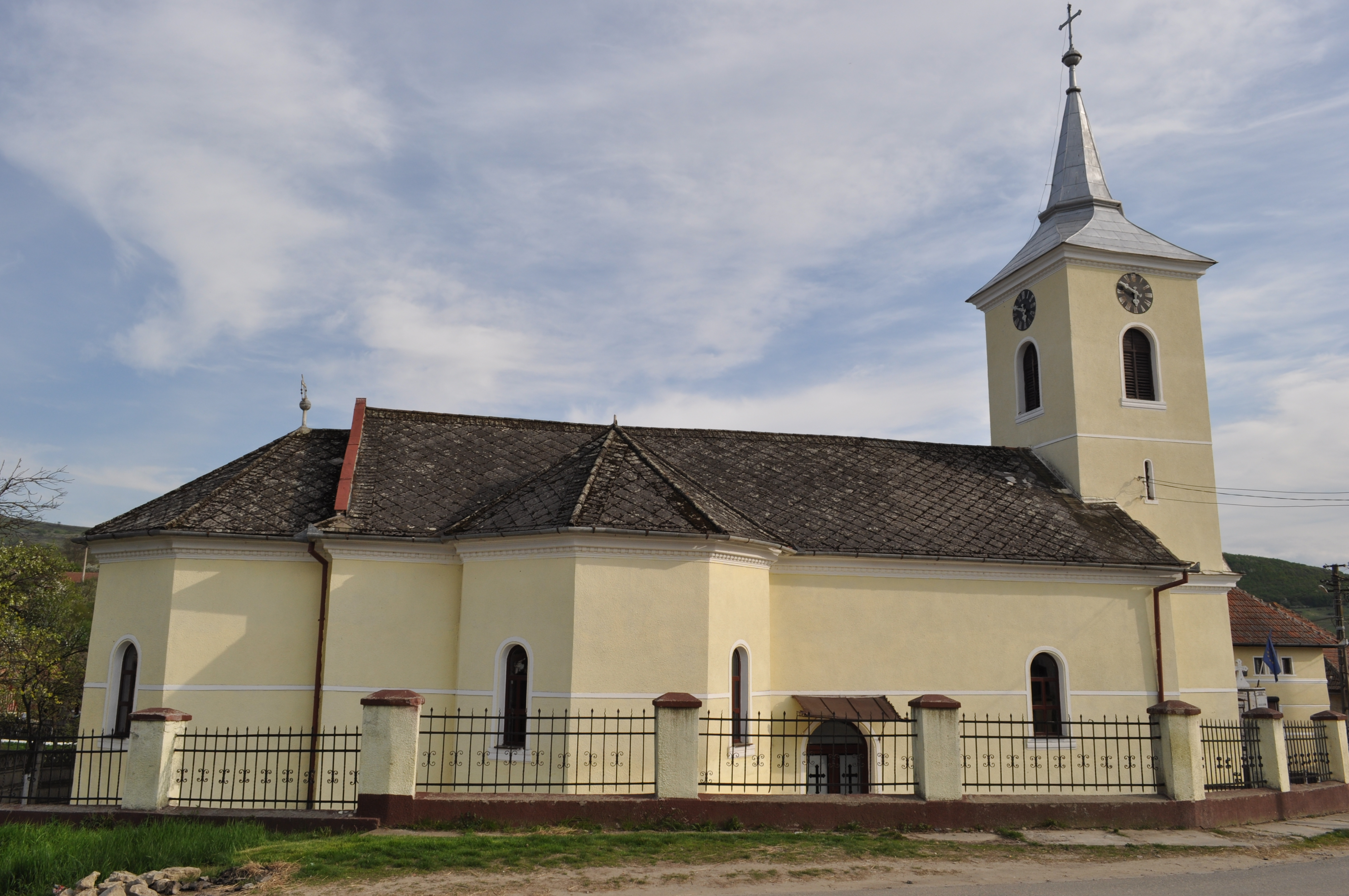
- Church in Șpring

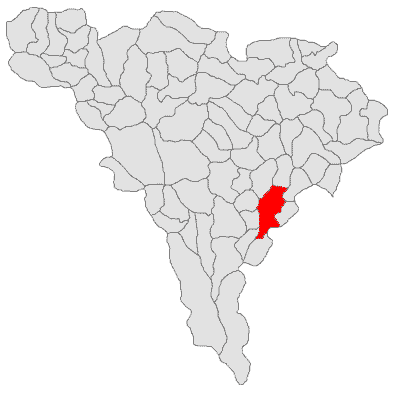
- Location in Alba County

- Location in Romania
- Coordinates: 45°58′N 23°47′E
- Country: Romania
- County: Alba

Government
  - Mayor (2020–2024): Iulia Stănilă (PNL)
- Area: 91.13 km^{2} (35.19 sq mi)
- Elevation: 310 m (1,020 ft)
- Population (2021-12-01): 2,354
  - Density: 25.83/km^{2} (66.90/sq mi)
- Time zone: UTC+02:00 (EET)
  - Summer (DST): UTC+03:00 (EEST)
- Postal code: 517755
- Area code: (+40) 02 58
- Vehicle reg.: AB
- Website: www.comunaspring.ro

Șpring (Hungarian: Spring; German: Gespreng) is a commune located in Alba County, Transylvania, Romania. It is composed of six villages: Carpen (Árvádtanya), Carpenii de Sus (Gyertyános), Cunța (Konca; Zeckesdorf), Drașov (Drassó; Troschen), Șpring, and Vingard (Vingárd; Weingartskirchen).

== Geography ==
The commune is situated at the western edge of the Transylvanian Plateau, at an altitude of 310 m (1,020 ft), on the banks of the river Secaș and its tributaries, the rivers Câlnic and Boz, with the river Șpring flowing into the latter. Șpring commune is located in the southeastern part of Alba County, 27 km (17 mi) from the county seat, Alba Iulia, on the border with Sibiu County.

Immediately to the south of Cunța village three major roads go east to west. The first is the A1 motorway, which links Bucharest with the Banat and Crișana regions in western Romania. The second and the third, running together in this stretch, are national roads DN1 and DN7 (part of European routes E68 and E81), the former connecting Bucharest to Cluj-Napoca and Oradea, and the latter to the Banat.

== Demographics ==
Historical population
| Year | Pop. | ±% |
|---|---|---|
| 1850 | 3,982 | — |
| 1900 | 5,168 | +29.8% |
| 1930 | 5,588 | +8.1% |
| 1966 | 4,319 | −22.7% |
| 1992 | 2,704 | −37.4% |
| 2002 | 2,536 | −6.2% |
| 2011 | 2,420 | −4.6% |
| 2021 | 2,354 | −2.7% |
Source: Census data

At the 2021 census, Șpring had a population of 2,354, of which 90.57% were Romanians and 2.04% Germans.

== Natives ==
- Septimiu Albini (1861–1919), journalist and political activist
- Gavriil Munteanu (1812–1869), scientist, translator, and one of the founding members of the Romanian Academy
