= Apoldu de Jos =

- Commune
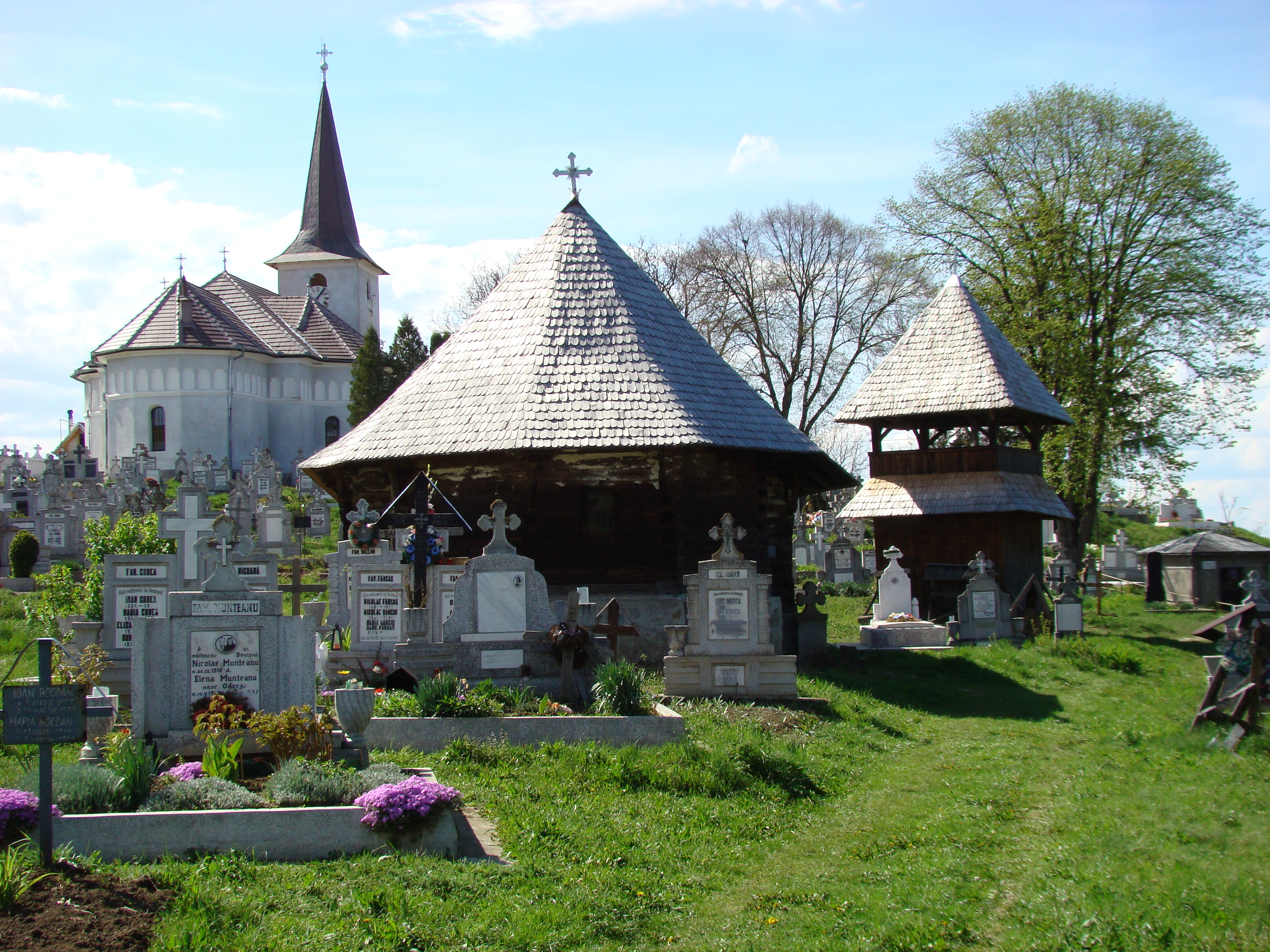
- Wooden church and the new church in Apoldu de Jos

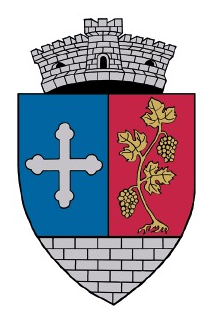
- Coat of arms

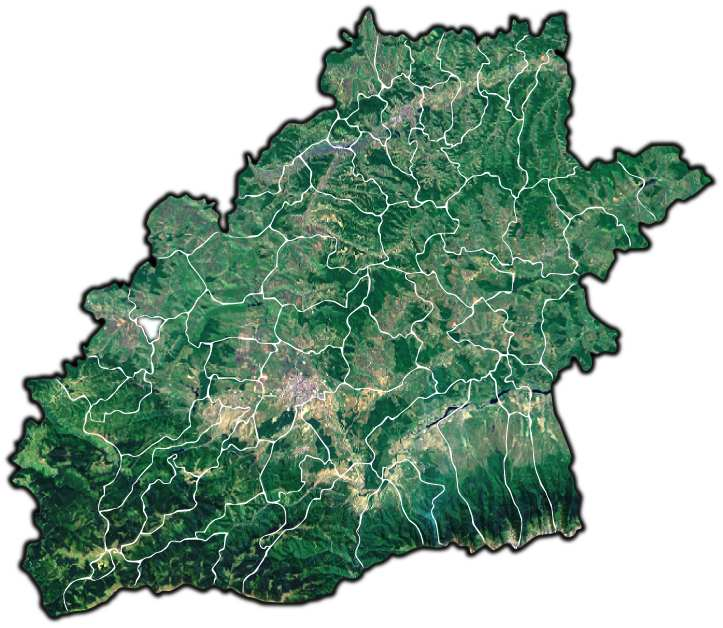
- Location in Sibiu County

- Location in Romania
- Coordinates: 45°52′N 23°51′E
- Country: Romania
- County: Sibiu

Government
  - Mayor (2024–2028): Ioan Florin Barbu (PSD)
- Area: 48.83 km^{2} (18.85 sq mi)
- Elevation: 338 m (1,109 ft)
- Population (2021-12-01): 1,184
  - Density: 24.25/km^{2} (62.80/sq mi)
- Time zone: UTC+02:00 (EET)
  - Summer (DST): UTC+03:00 (EEST)
- Postal code: 557010
- Area code: (+40) 0269
- Vehicle reg.: SB
- Website: comunaapoldudejos.ro

Apoldu de Jos (German: Kleinpold; Hungarian: Kisapold) is a commune located in Sibiu County, Transylvania, Romania. It is composed of two villages, Apoldu de Jos and Sângătin (Kleinenyed; Kisenyed). The commune is located in the historic Unterwald in the southwest of the Transylvanian Plateau.

== History ==
Apoldu de Jos was founded by Transylvanian Saxons and first documented in 1289. According to J. M. Ackner, C. Goos, and V. Christescu, archaeological finds suggesting a colonization in Roman times were made in the area of Apoldu de Jos – called by the locals Între Apoalde and La Rodeni.

In 1750, 1,236 Romanians lived in Kleinpold. In 1773, about 60 landlords from Austria settled in Kleinpold. The inhabitants were engaged in mainly agriculture and livestock.

== Population ==
Historical population
Year	Pop.	±%
1850	2,868	—
1890	2,701	−5.8%
1900	3,217	+19.1%
1920	3,388	+5.3%
1941	3,367	−0.6%
1977	2,150	−36.1%
1992	1,585	−26.3%
2002	1,525	−3.8%
2011	1,359	−10.9%
2022	1,184	−12.9%
Source: Official Austro-Hungarian and Romanian census data

The highest number of Hungarians (84) and Roma (165) was registered in 1850. In 2002, 1,525 people lived in Apoldu de Jos, of which 17 were Roma, two Germans, one Hungarian, and the rest were Romanians.

== Attractions ==
- Saint John the Evangelist's wooden church, built in Apoldu de Jos (from Ocna Sibiului) in 1771 and renewed in 1881.
- Archangels' wooden church, built in Sângătin in 1687.
