= Homorod =

Homorod may refer to several entities in Romania:

- Homorod, Brașov, commune in Brașov County
- Homorod, a village in Geoagiu Town, Hunedoara County
- Băile Homorod, a village in Vlăhița Town, Harghita County
- Homorod (Dumbrăvița), left tributary of the Olt in eastern Brașov County
- Homorod (Homorod), right tributary of the Olt in northern Brașov County
- Homorod (Mureș), tributary of the Mureș in Hunedoara County
- Homorod, tributary of the Sârbi in Hunedoara County
- Homorod (Someș), tributary of the Homorodul Nou (Someș basin) in Satu Mare County
