= Daia (Homorod) =

- Location within Romania

Location
- Country: Romania
- Counties: Harghita County
- Villages: Ighiu, Daia

Physical characteristics
- Mouth: Homorodul Mare
  - location: Orășeni
  - coordinates: 46.1663°N 25.3594°E
- Length: 9 km (5.6 mi)
- Basin size: 28 km^{2} (11 sq mi)

Basin features
- Progression: Homorodul Mare→ Homorod→ Olt→ Danube→ Black Sea

The Daia is a right tributary of the river Homorodul Mare in Romania. It flows into the Homorodul Mare in Orășeni. Its length is 9 km (5.6 mi). Its basin size is 28 km^{2} (11 sq mi).
