= Băile Homorod =

Băile Homorod may refer to the following places in Romania:

- Băile Homorod, a village in the commune Vlăhița, Harghita County
- Băile Homorod, a tributary of the river Homorodul Mare in Harghita County
- Castellum of Băile Homorod, a Roman fortification in Harghita County
