= Paloș (Homorodul Mare) =

River in Romania, tributary of Homorodul Mare

- Location within Romania

Location
- Country: Romania
- Counties: Harghita, Brașov
- Villages: Petecu, Paloș, Cața

Physical characteristics
- Mouth: Homorodul Mare
  - location: Cața
  - coordinates: 46.0875°N 25.2754°E
- Length: 15 km (9.3 mi)
- Basin size: 59 km^{2} (23 sq mi)

Basin features
- Progression: Homorodul Mare→ Homorod→ Olt→ Danube→ Black Sea
- Tributaries
  - left: Valea Bucinilor

The Paloș is a right tributary of the river Homorodul Mare in Romania. It flows into the Homorodul Mare in Cața. Its length is 15 km (9.3 mi) and its basin size is 59 km^{2} (23 sq mi).
