= Ghipeș =

- Location within Romania

Location
- Country: Romania
- Counties: Harghita County
- Villages: Ghipeș, Mărtiniș

Physical characteristics
- Mouth: Homorodul Mare
  - location: Mărtiniș
  - coordinates: 46.2261°N 25.3949°E
- Length: 13 km (8.1 mi)
- Basin size: 34 km^{2} (13 sq mi)

Basin features
- Progression: Homorodul Mare→ Homorod→ Olt→ Danube→ Black Sea

The Ghipeș is a right tributary of the river Homorodul Mare in Romania. It flows into the Homorodul Mare near Mărtiniș. Its length is 13 km (8.1 mi) and its basin size is 34 km^{2} (13 sq mi).
