= Hoghiz =

Hoghiz Olthévíz
- Commune
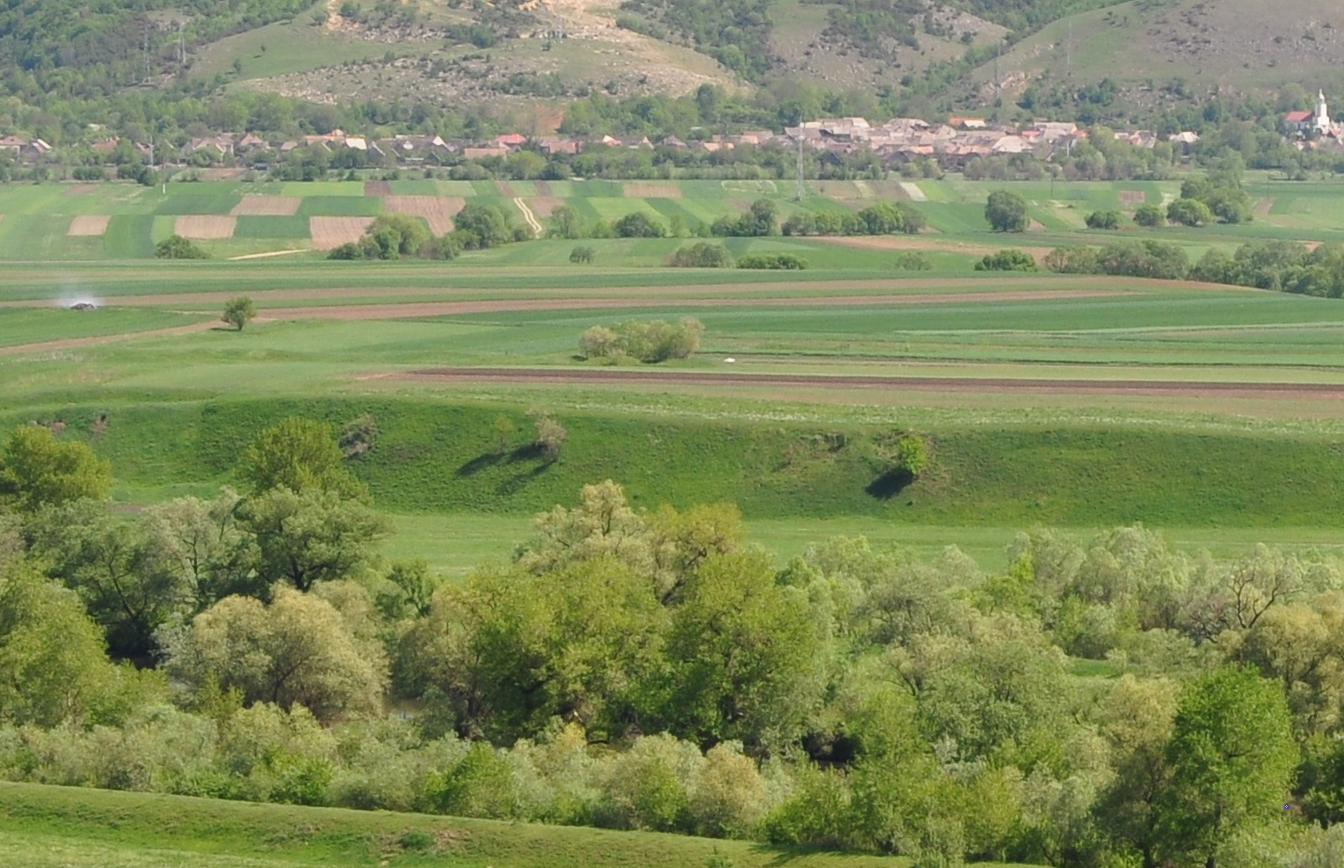
- View from Ungra of Castra of Hoghiz

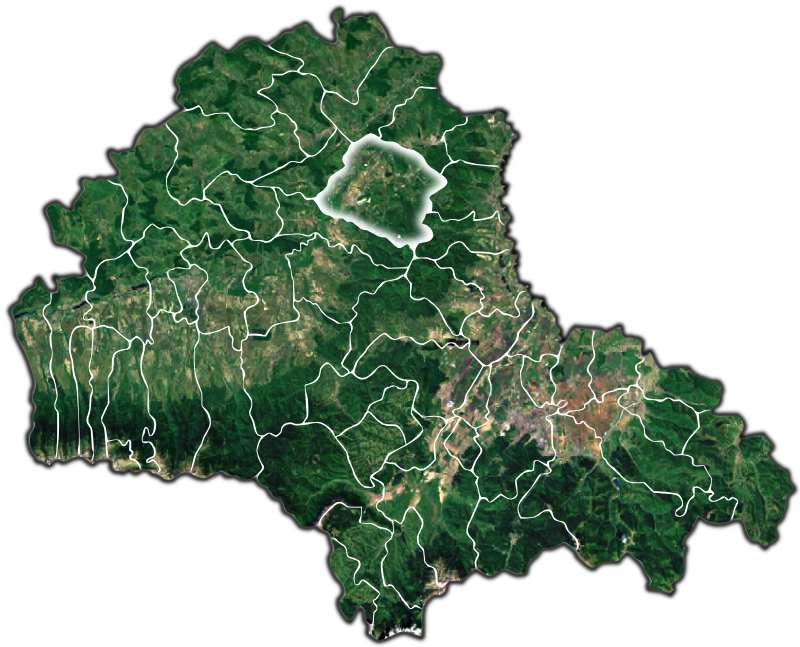
- Location within the county

- Location in Romania
- Coordinates: 45°59′N 25°18′E
- Country: Romania
- County: Brașov

Government
  - Mayor (2020–2024): Ioan Buta (PSD)
- Area: 178.38 km^{2} (68.87 sq mi)
- Elevation: 479 m (1,572 ft)
- Population (2021-12-01): 4,896
  - Density: 27.45/km^{2} (71.09/sq mi)
- Time zone: UTC+02:00 (EET)
  - Summer (DST): UTC+03:00 (EEST)
- Postal code: 507095
- Area code: (+40) 02 68
- Vehicle reg.: BV
- Website: www.comunahoghiz.ro

Hoghiz (German: Warmwasser; Hungarian: Hévíz or Olthévíz) is a commune in Brașov County, Transylvania, Romania. It is composed of six villages: Bogata Olteană (Oltbogát), Cuciulata (Katscheloden; Kucsuláta), Dopca (Dopich; Datk), Fântâna (Olthidegkút), Hoghiz and Lupșa (Lupsa).

== Geography ==
The commune is situated on the Transylvanian Plateau, on the left bank of the Olt River. It is located in the northern part of the county, 10 km (6.2 mi) from the town of Rupea and 56 km (35 mi) from the county seat, Brașov.

== Demographics ==
Historical population
Year	Pop.	±%
1850	3,427	—
1992	5,057	+47.6%
2002	4,981	−1.5%
2011	5,025	+0.9%
2021	4,896	−2.6%
Source: Census data

At the 2002 census, Hoghiz had 4,981 inhabitants; 66.4% were Romanian Orthodox, 17.6% Unitarian, 8.4% Reformed, 3.1% Pentecostal, and 2.8% Roman Catholic. At the 2011 census, the population had increased to 5,025; of those, 68.4% were Romanians, 27.8% Hungarians, and 3.6% Roma. At the 2021 census, the commune had a population of 4,896, of which 71.45% were Romanians and 21.41% Hungarians.

== Natives ==
- Viorel Morariu (1931–2017), rugby union player
- Aron Pumnul (1818–1866), philologist, teacher, and national and revolutionary activist

== Villages ==
=== Cuciulata ===
The village of Cuciulata was first attested in a document of 1372 as Vila Roczolod. It also appears as Kucsalota (1589), Kucstulata (1637) and Kociulata (1648). It is located on the south banks of Olt River at the base of the Perșani Mountains, and is crossed by Lupșa Creek. The road DJ104 passes through the village center and DC20 road connects Cuciulata to Lupșa village. Archaeological excavations have shown the existence of a settlement in this place in the Bronze Age. The ruins of a 1st-century BC Dacian stronghold have also been discovered. Among the monuments in the village are a wooden church dating from 1700–1752 and a stone Orthodox church from 1784 to 1791.

== See also ==
- Castra of Hoghiz
- Dacian fortress of Cuciulata
- Reformed church of Hoghiz
