= Homorodul Mare =

- Location within Romania

Location
- Country: Romania
- Counties: Harghita, Brașov

Physical characteristics
- Mouth: Homorod
  - location: Homorod
  - coordinates: 46.0375°N 25.2859°E
- Length: 54 km (34 mi)
- Basin size: 352 km^{2} (136 sq mi)

Basin features
- Progression: Homorod→ Olt→ Danube→ Black Sea
- Tributaries
  - left: Băile Homorod
  - right: Ghipeș, Daia, Paloș

The Homorodul Mare is the right headwater of the river Homorod in Romania. At its confluence with the river Homorodul Mic in the village Homorod, the river Homorod is formed. It flows through the villages Băile Homorod, Comănești, Aldea, Mărtiniș, Rareș, Sânpaul, Petreni, Orășeni, Ionești, Drăușeni, Cața and Homorod. Its length is 54 km (34 mi) and its basin size is 352 km^{2} (136 sq mi).
