= Păstrăvul River =

Păstrăvul River may refer to:

- Păstrăvul, a tributary of the Ozunca in Covasna County
- Păstrăvul, a tributary of the Homorodul Mic in Harghita County
