= Aron Pumnul =

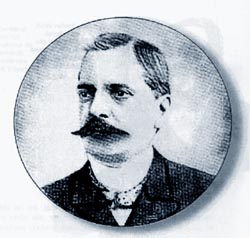
- Born: 27 November 1818; Cuciulata, Brașov, Austrian Empire
- Died: 24 January 1866 (aged 47); Chernivtsi, Bukovina
- Citizenship: Austrian Empire
- Occupations: philologist, teacher, revolutionary

Aron Pumnul (27 November 1818 – 12 January O.S. (24 January N.S.) 1866) was a Romanian philologist and teacher as well as a national and revolutionary activist in Transylvania and later in Bukovina (then in the Habsburg monarchy).

He was the subject of the poem "La mormîntul lui Aron Pumnul" ("At the Grave of Aron Pumnul") by Mihai Eminescu.

In the field of linguistics, he supported the adoption of Latin alphabet instead of the Cyrillic alphabet, but he opposed direct loanwords from other Romance languages, promoting instead the Romanianization of the language, through the creation of words using Romanian roots (for instance vorbămînt for etymology and tîmplămînt for history) or importing Latin words by passing them through the phonetic changes from Latin to Romanian.
