= Homorodul Mic =

- Location within Romania

Location
- Country: Romania
- Counties: Harghita, Brașov
- Towns: Vlăhița

Physical characteristics
- Mouth: Homorod
  - coordinates: 46.0375°N 25.2859°E
- Length: 51 km (32 mi)
- Basin size: 203 km^{2} (78 sq mi)

Basin features
- Progression: Homorod→ Olt→ Danube→ Black Sea
- Tributaries
  - left: Păstrăvul, Aluniș, Valea Românilor
- River code: VIII.1.71.6

The Homorodul Mic is the left headwater of the river Homorod in Romania. At its confluence with the river Homorodul Mare in the village Homorod, the river Homorod is formed. It flows through the villages and towns Căpâlnița, Vlăhița, Lueta, Merești, Crăciunel, Ocland, Satu Nou, Jimbor, Mercheașa and Homorod. Its length is 51 km (32 mi) and its basin size is 203 km^{2} (78 sq mi).
