= Dacian fortress of Cuciulata =

- Location within Romania
- 45.94°N 25.27°E
- Location: Stogul lui Coțofan, Cuciulata, Brașov, Romania

History
- Built: 1st century BC

Site notes
- Condition: Ruined

Monument istoric
- Reference no.: BV-I-s-B-11275

It was a Dacian fortified town.
