= Ungra =

- Commune
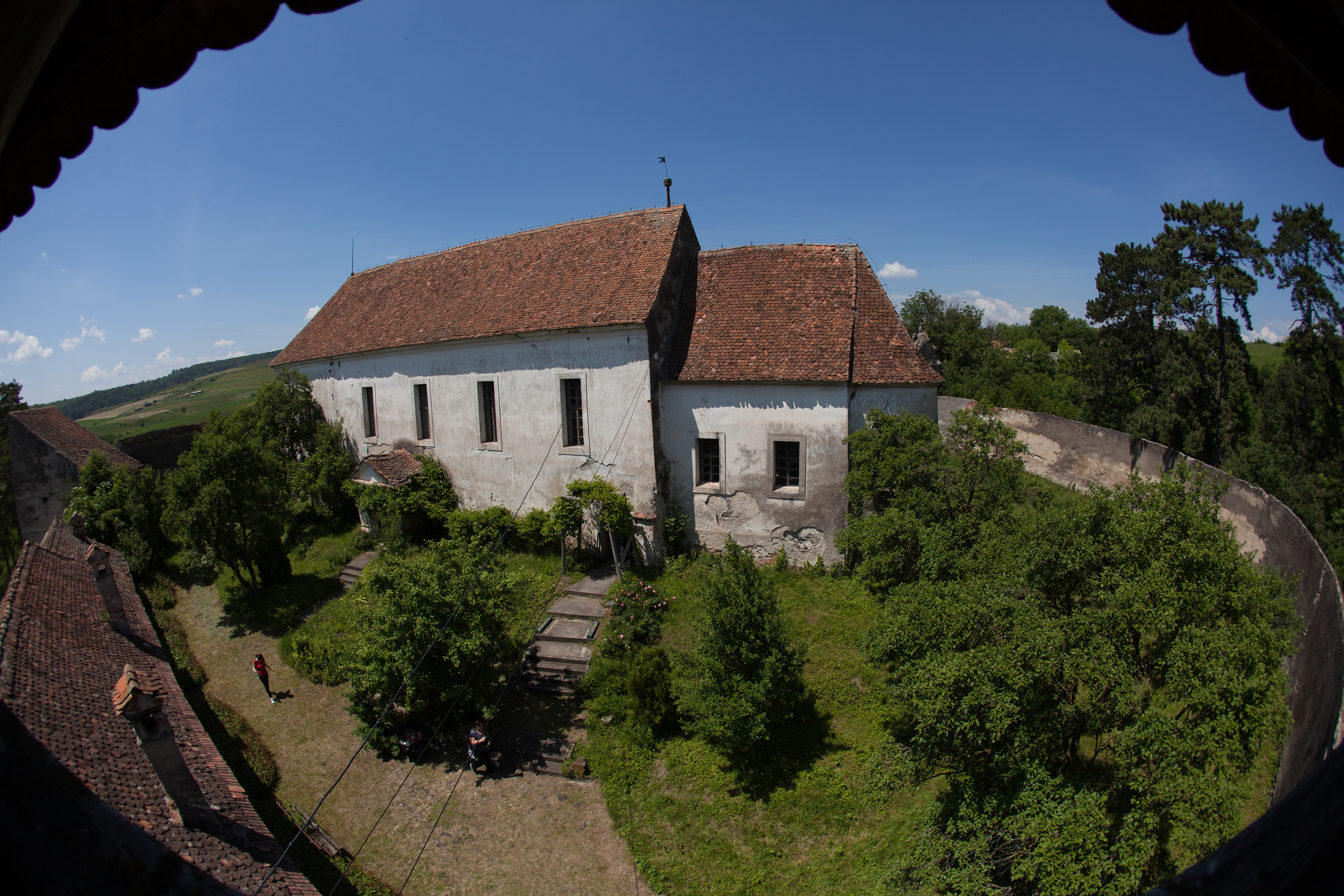
- Fortified church in Ungra

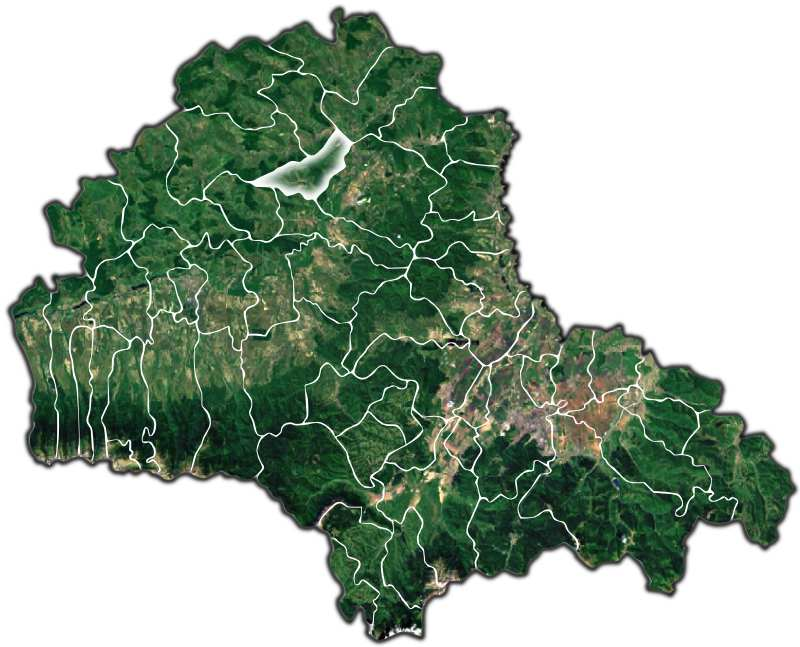
- Location within the county

- Location in Romania
- Coordinates: 45°59′N 25°16′E
- Country: Romania
- County: Brașov

Government
  - Mayor (2020–2024): Silviu-Mircea Șchiopu (PNL)
- Area: 67.38 km^{2} (26.02 sq mi)
- Elevation: 450 m (1,480 ft)
- Population (2021-12-01): 2,009
  - Density: 29.82/km^{2} (77.22/sq mi)
- Time zone: UTC+02:00 (EET)
  - Summer (DST): UTC+03:00 (EEST)
- Postal code: 507240
- Area code: (+40) 02 68
- Vehicle reg.: BV
- Website: primariaungra.ro

Ungra (German: Galt; Hungarian: Ugra) is a commune in Brașov County, Transylvania, Romania. It is composed of two villages, Dăișoara (Dahl; Longodár) and Ungra.

Ungra is located in the northern part of the county, at 9 km (5.6 mi) from Rupea and 62 km (39 mi) from the county seat, Brașov. It sits on the right bank on the river Olt, not far from where the Homorod and Dăișoara rivers flow into it.

In Ungra there is a medieval 13th century Transylvanian Saxon church and many old houses.

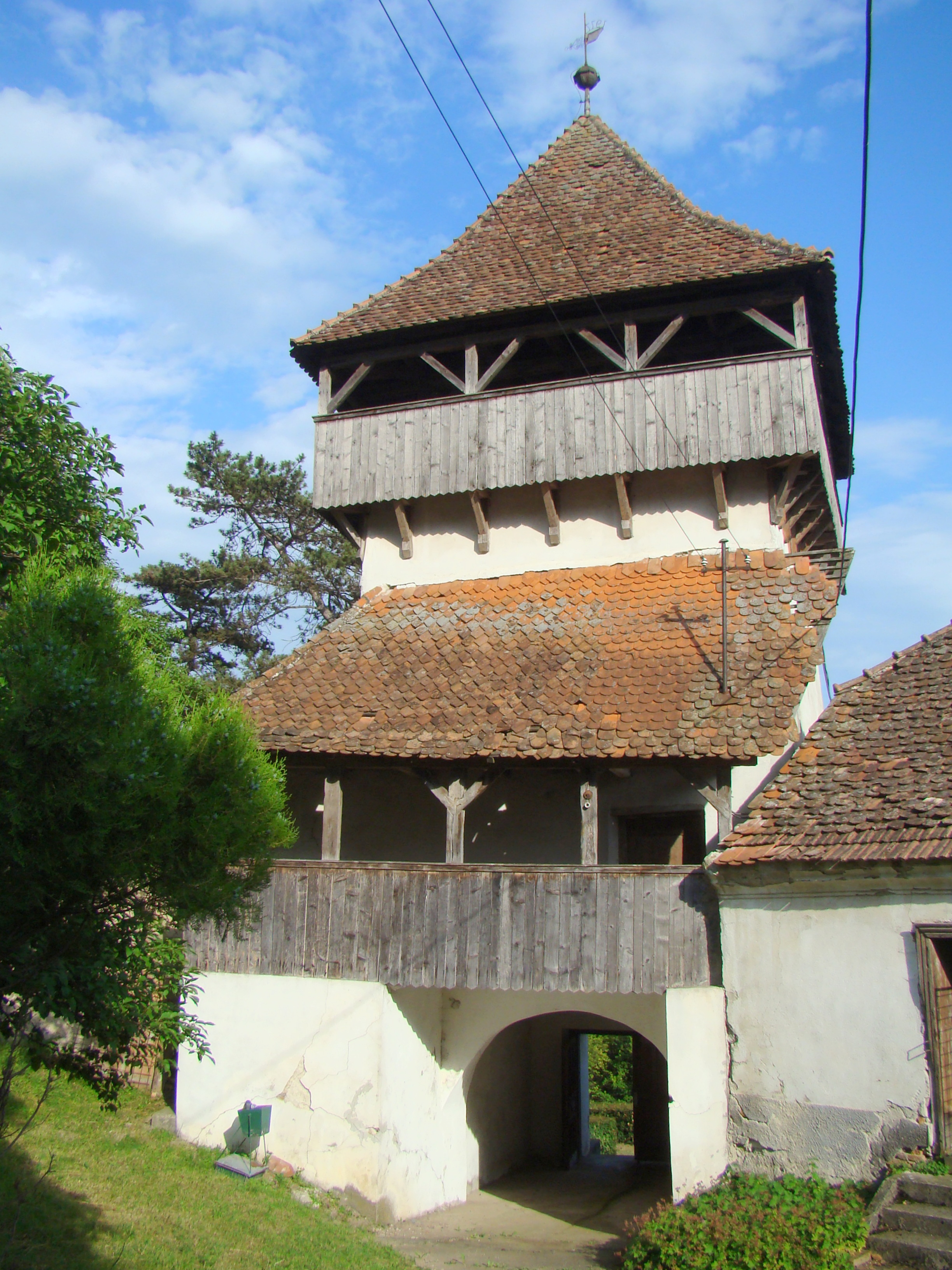
Gate tower of the Saxon refuge fortress built around their fortified church

Historical population
| Year | Pop. | ±% |
|---|---|---|
| 1850 | 1,908 | — |
| 1941 | 2,634 | +38.1% |
| 1956 | 2,569 | −2.5% |
| 1992 | 1,987 | −22.7% |
| 2002 | 2,038 | +2.6% |
| 2011 | 1,949 | −4.4% |
| 2021 | 2,009 | +3.1% |
Source: Census data

At the 2011 census, 88.4% of the 1,949 inhabitants were Romanians, 8.4% Roma, 1.7% Germans, and 1.5% Hungarians. At the 2021 census, Ungra had a population of 2,009; of those, 70.18% were Romanians, 15.18% Roma, and 1.1% Germans.

== See also ==
- Castra of Hoghiz
