= Homorod, Brașov =

Homorod
- Commune
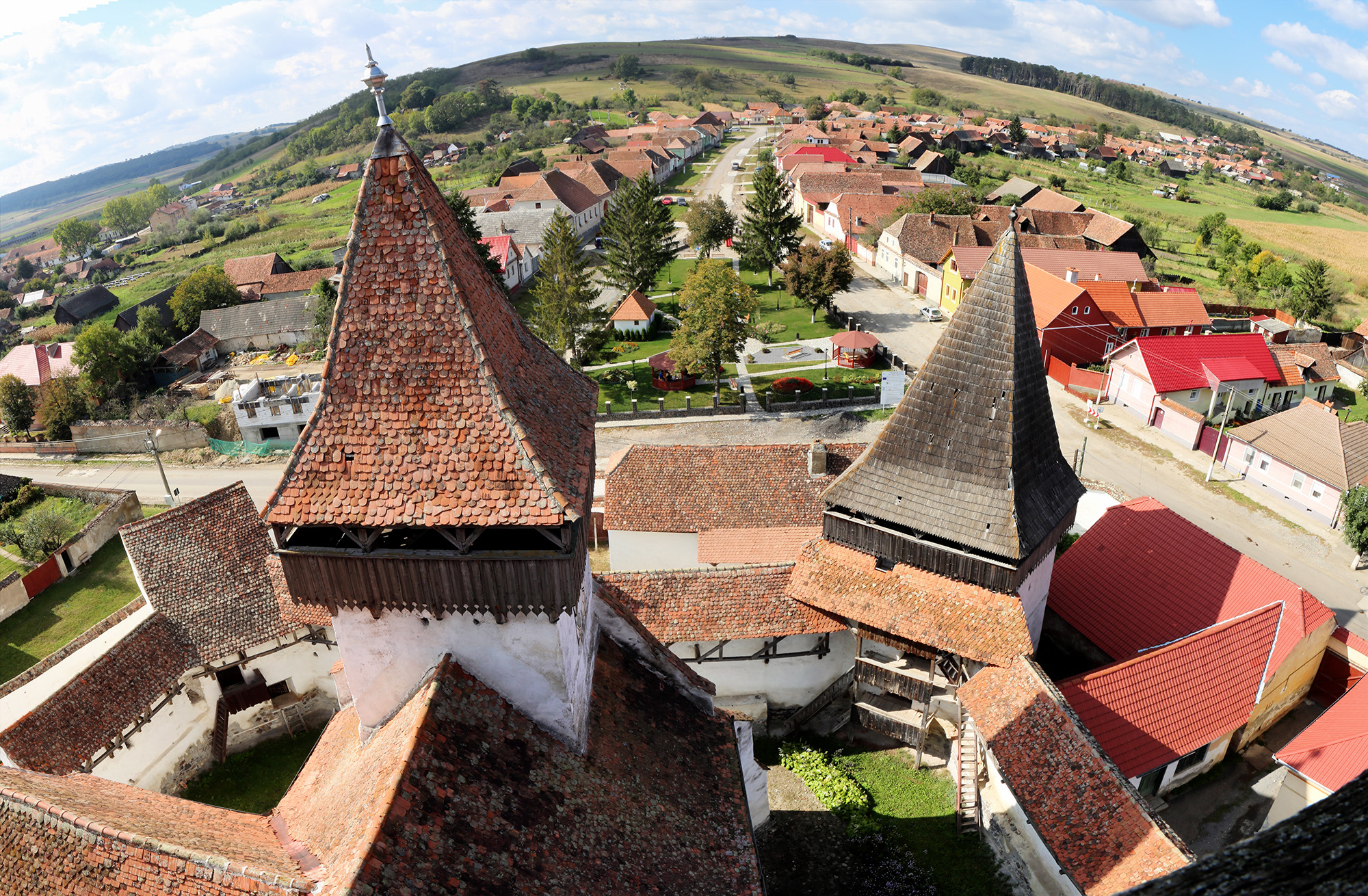
- Fortified church in Homorod

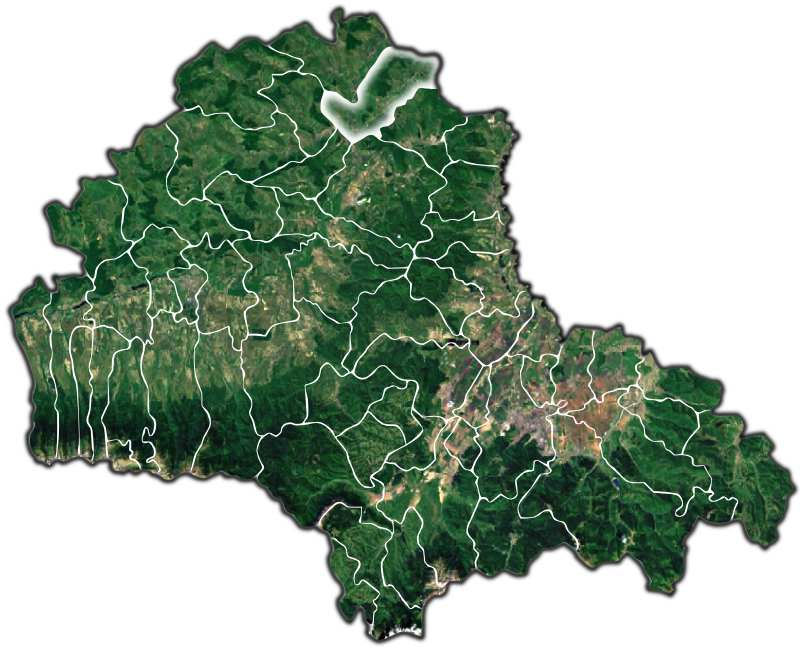
- Location within the county

- Location in Romania
- Coordinates: 46°2′30″N 25°17′3″E
- Country: Romania
- County: Brașov

Government
  - Mayor (2020–2024): Ștefan-Doru Șona (PSD)
- Area: 119.61 km^{2} (46.18 sq mi)
- Elevation: 463 m (1,519 ft)
- Population (2021-12-01): 2,260
  - Density: 18.9/km^{2} (48.9/sq mi)
- Time zone: UTC+02:00 (EET)
  - Summer (DST): UTC+03:00 (EEST)
- Postal code: 507105
- Area code: (+40) 02 68
- Vehicle reg.: BV
- Website: homorod.ro

Homorod (German: Hamruden; Hungarian: Homoród) is a commune in Brașov County, Transylvania, Romania. It is composed of three villages: Homorod, Jimbor (Sommerburg; Székelyzsombor), and Mercheașa (Streitfort; Mirkvásár).

The commune is located in the northern part of the county, on the border with Harghita County, 62 km (39 mi) from the county seat, Brașov. It lies on the banks of the Homorod River, at the confluence of the Homorodul Mare and Homorodul Mic.

== Demographics ==
Historical population
Year	Pop.	±%
2002	2,400	—
2011	2,209	−8.0%
2021	2,260	+2.3%
Source: Census data

At the 2021 census, Homorod had a population of 2,260; of those, 64.51% were Romanians, 19.69% Hungarians, and 5.22% Roma. At the 2011 census, the commune had 2,209 inhabitants, of which 49.3% were Romanians, 29.9% Hungarians, 18.4% Roma, and 1.2% Germans. At the 2002 census, 64.6% were Romanian Orthodox, 11.8% Evangelical Lutheran, 8.3% Roman Catholic, 6.5% Unitarian, 2.8% Reformed, 2.3% belonged to another religion, and 1.5% Evangelical of Augustan Confession.

== Natives ==
- József Nyírő (1889–1953), Hungarian writer and politician associated with fascism
- Wilhelm Staedel (1890–1971), bishop of the Evangelical Church in Romania from 1941 to 1944

== See also ==
- List of castles in Romania
- Tourism in Romania
- Villages with fortified churches in Transylvania
