= Castra of Hoghiz =

Fort in the Roman province of Dacia

- Castra of Ungra
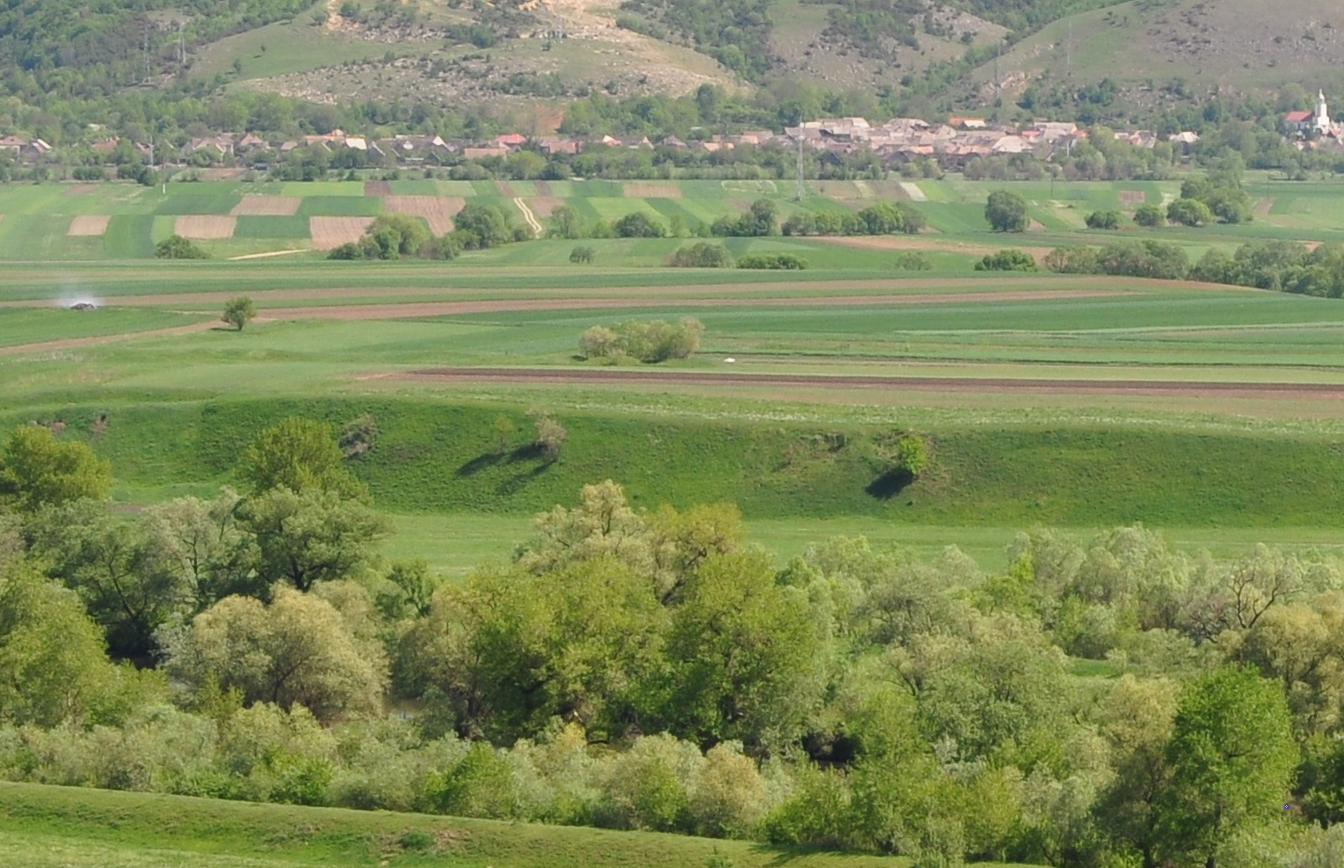
- View from Ungra (2013)

- Location within Romania
- 45.977956°N 25.278792°E
- Location: La cetate, Hoghiz, Brașov, Romania

History
- Founded: 2nd century AD
- Abandoned: 3rd century AD

Site notes
- Elevation: 460 m (1,510 ft)
- Excavation dates: 1949; 2003
- Archaeologists: Dumitru Protase
- Condition: Ruined

The castra of Hoghiz was a fort in the Roman province of Dacia. The fort was built in the 2nd century AD, on the left bank of the Olt River, at a place where a Dacian settlement existing already in the 2nd century BC was unearthed. The fort and the nearby village were abandoned in the 3rd century AD. The ruins of the castra are located in Hoghiz, a village of Transylvania in Romania.

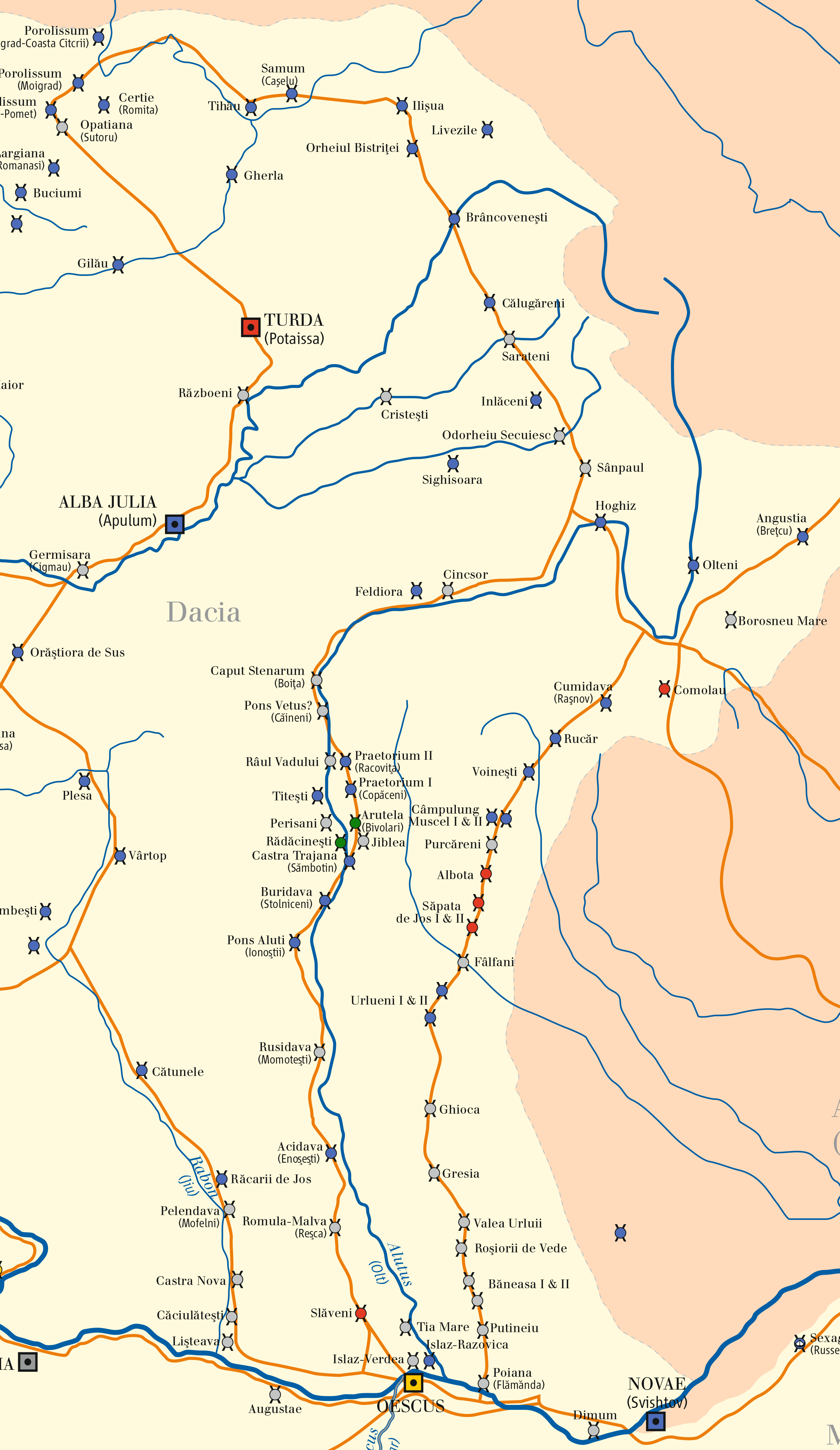
Limes Alutanus + Transalutanus

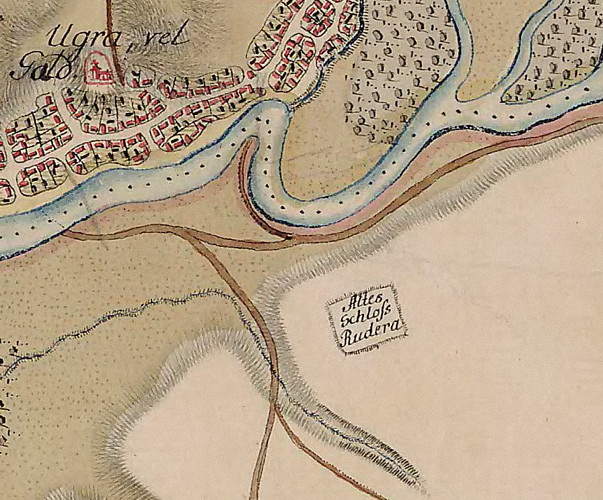
The fort identified as "old castle "Rudera"" in Josephinian Land Survey

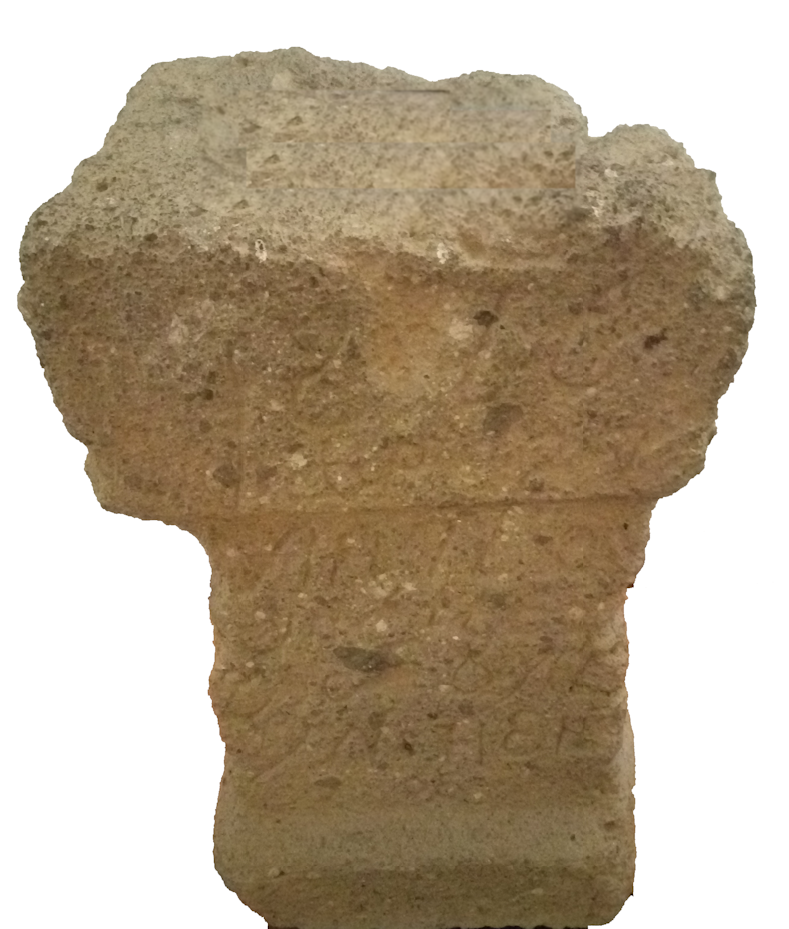
Votive altar (2019)

== Gallery ==
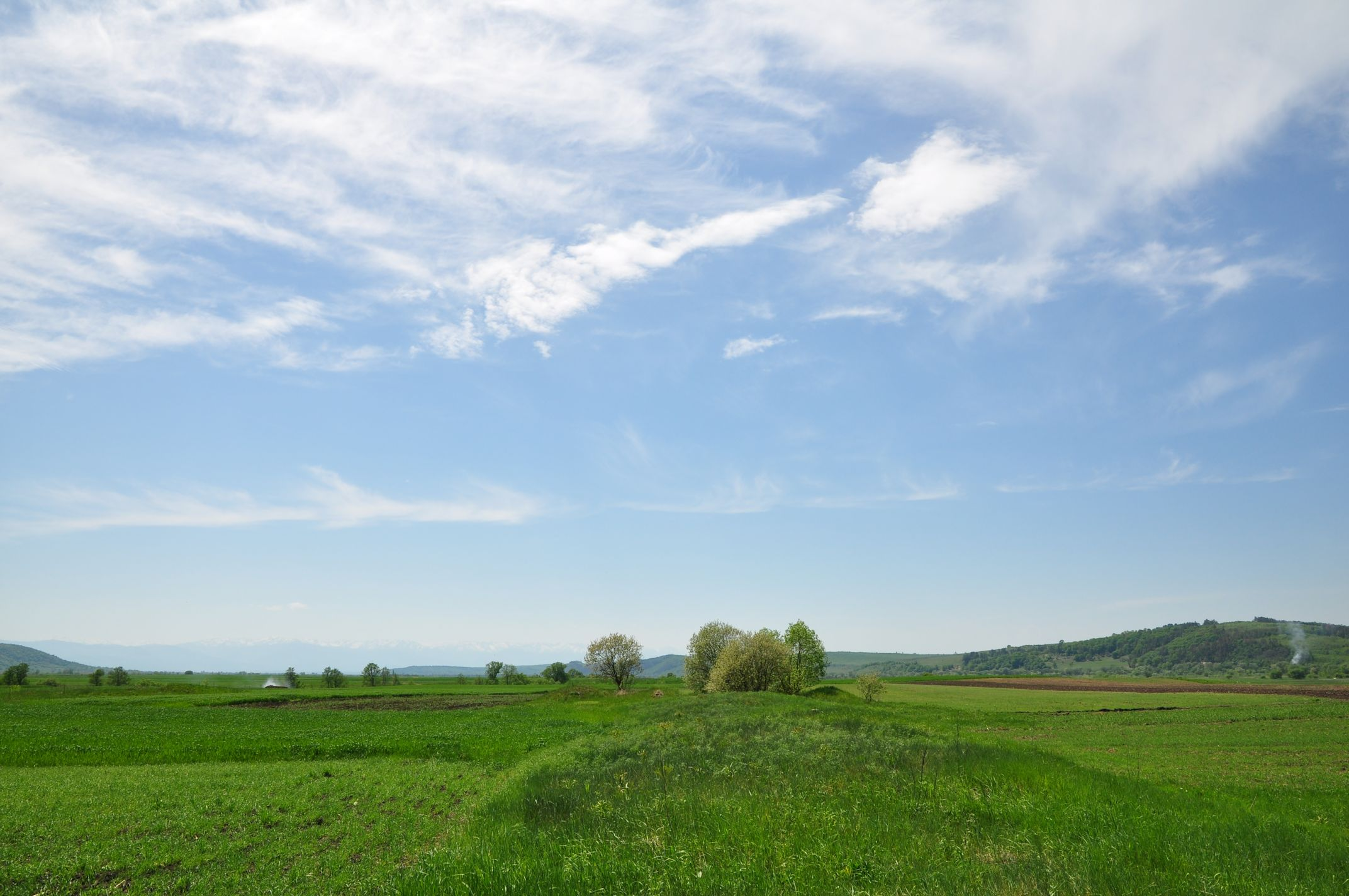

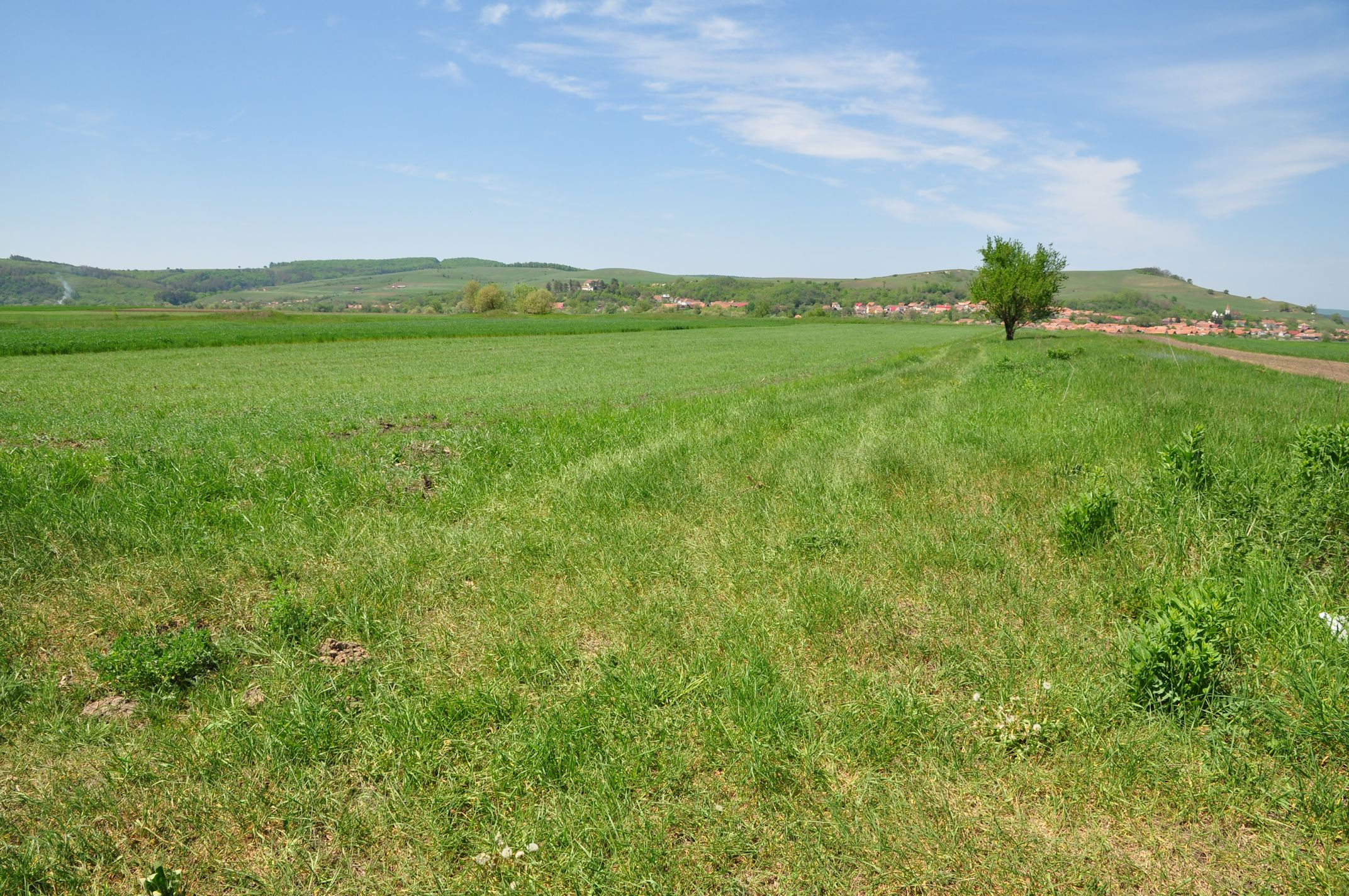

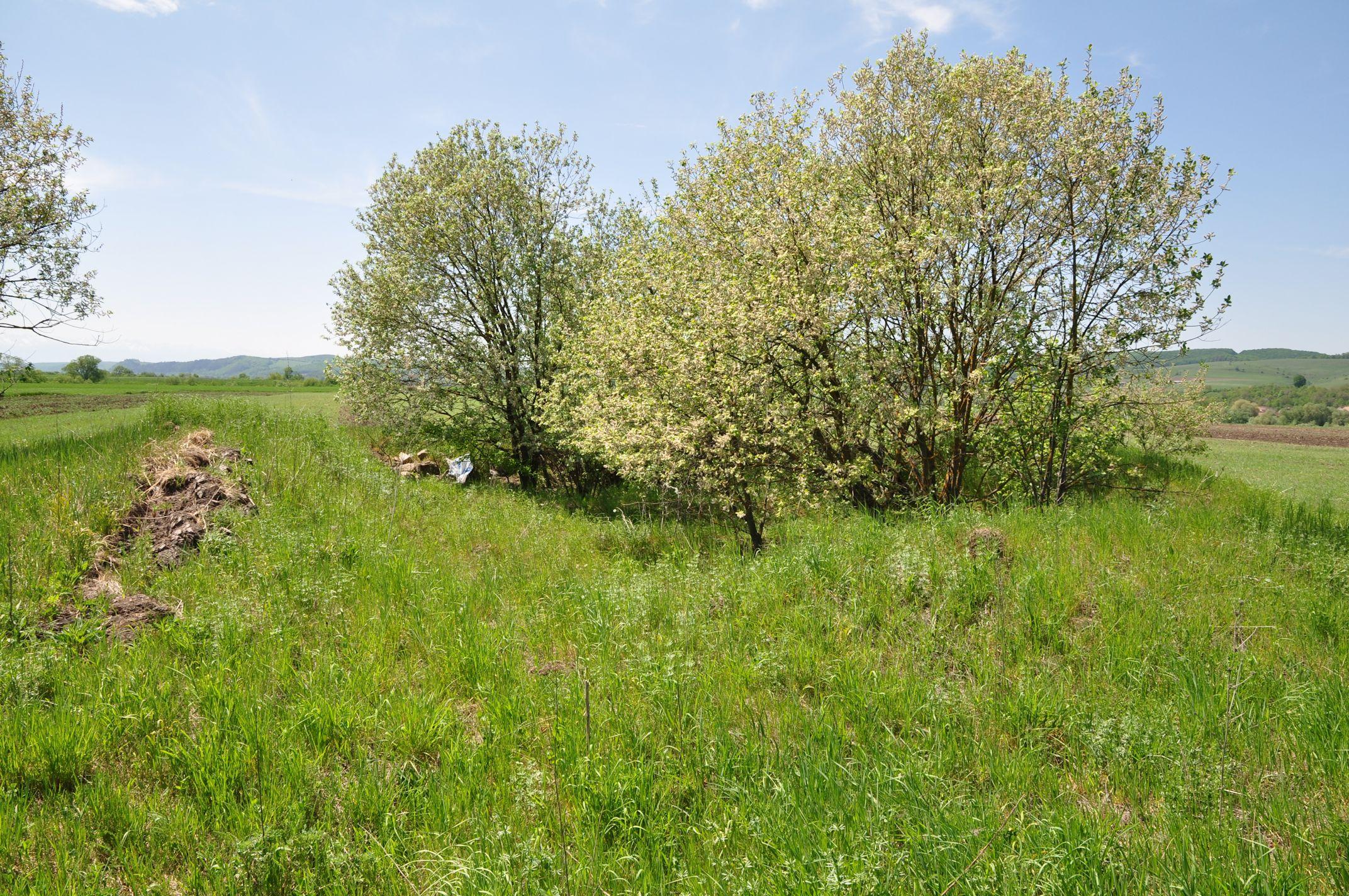

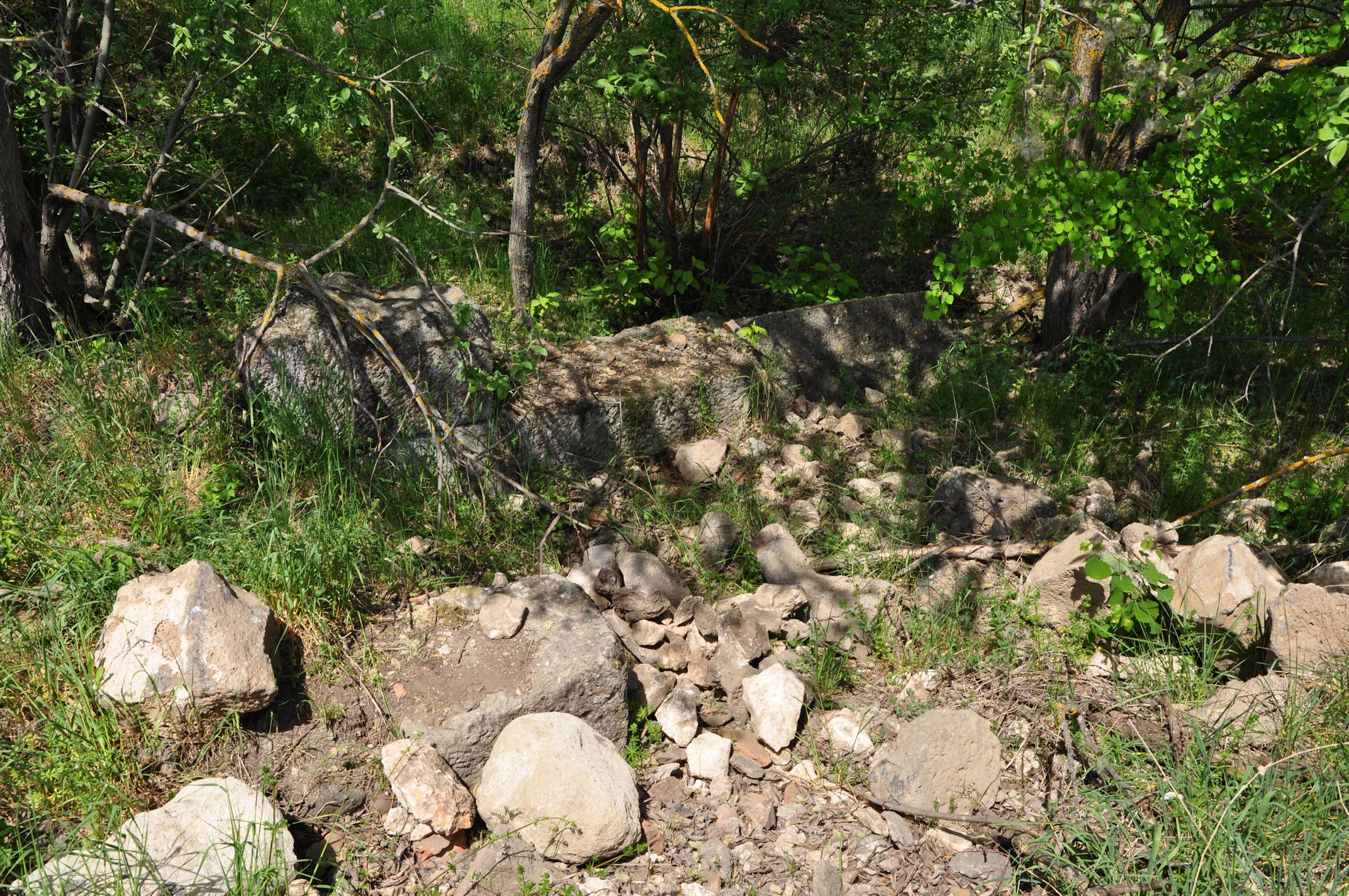

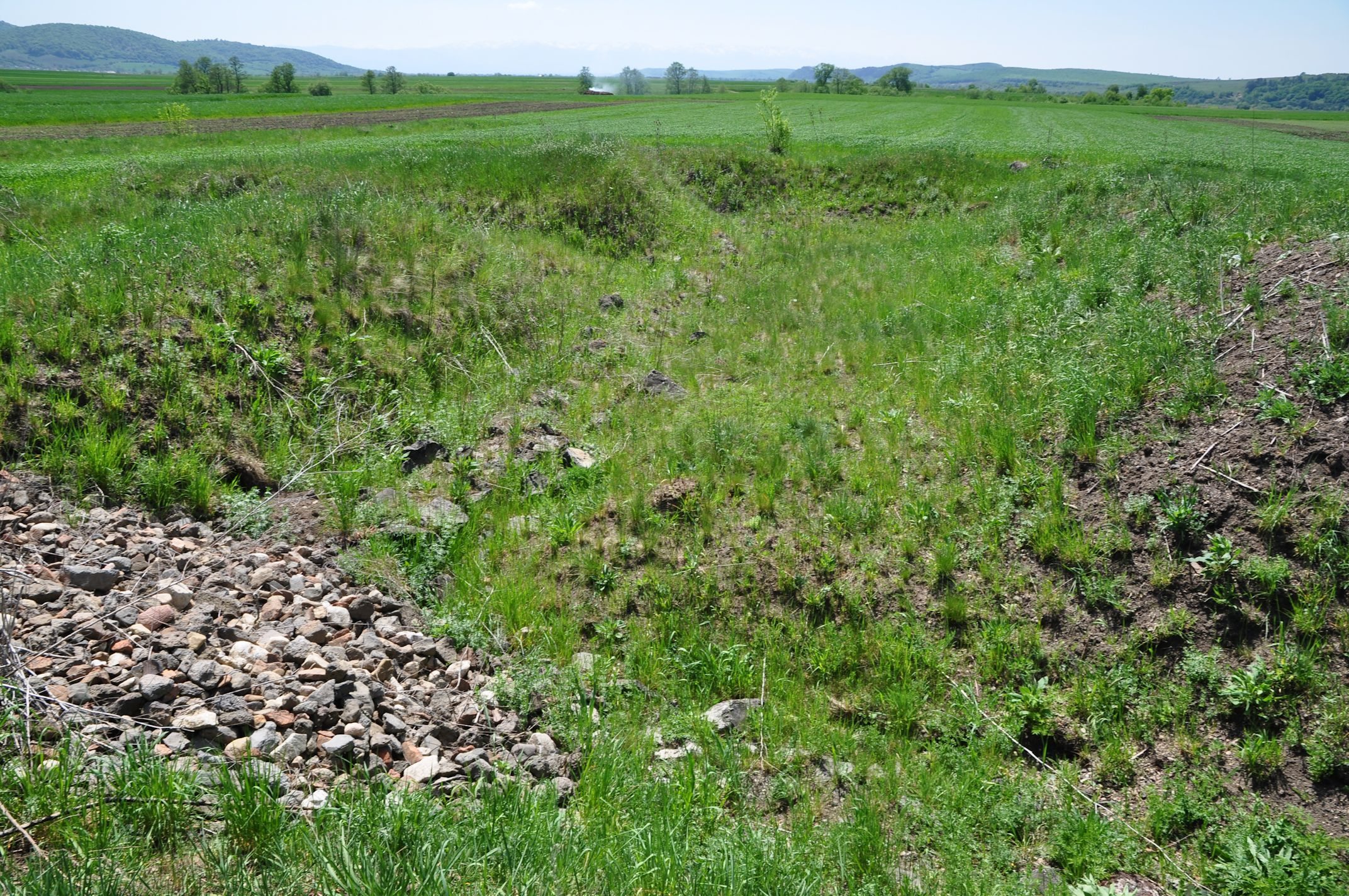

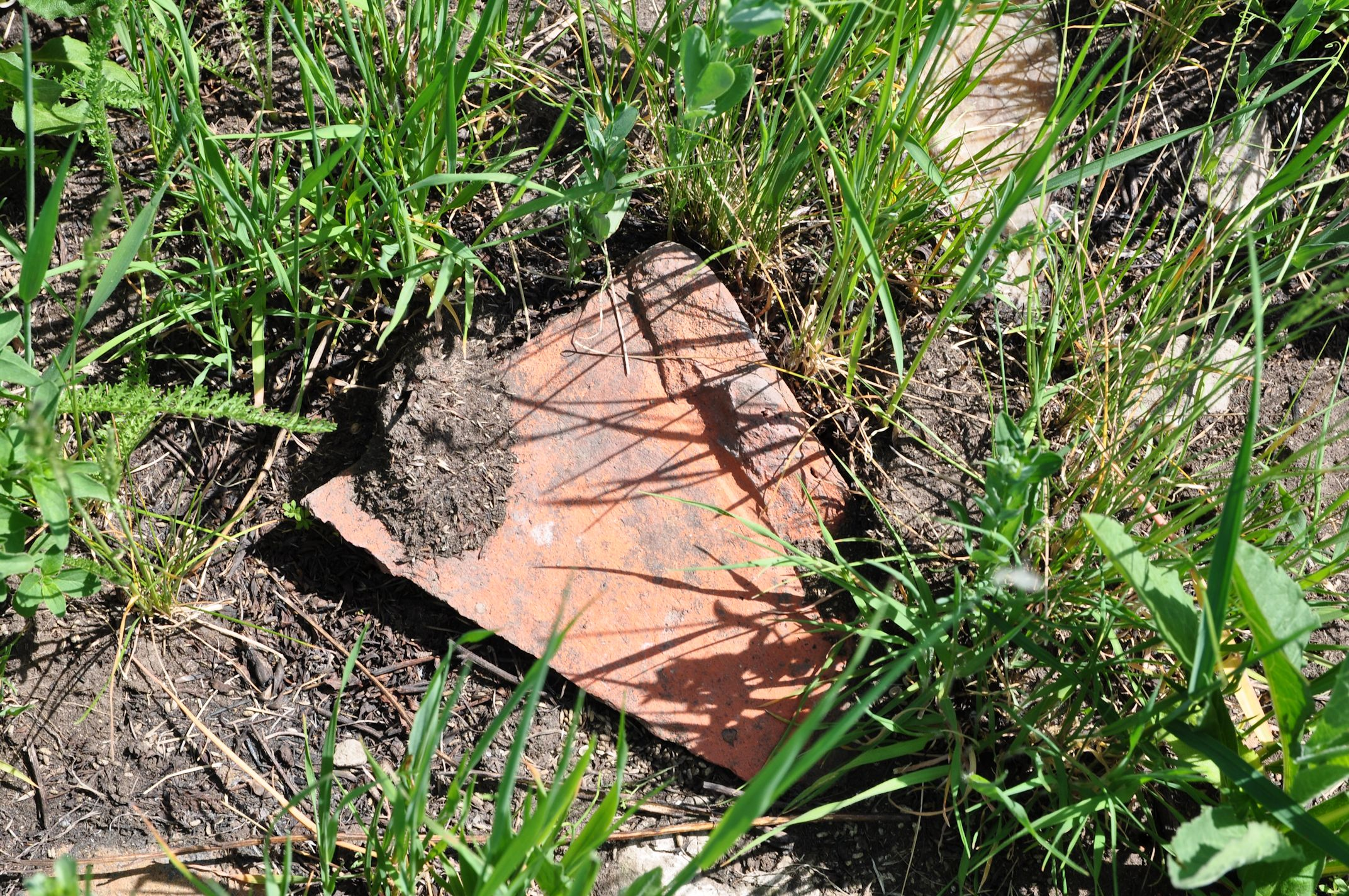

== See also ==
- List of castra
