= Homorod (Mureș) =

Homorod Homoród-patak
- Location within Romania

Location
- Country: Romania
- Counties: Hunedoara County

Physical characteristics
- Mouth: Mureș
  - location: Homorod
  - coordinates: 45.9232°N 23.2575°E
- Length: 14 km (8.7 mi)
- Basin size: 33 km^{2} (13 sq mi)

Basin features
- Progression: Mureș→ Tisza→ Danube→ Black Sea
- Tributaries
  - left: Pria

The Homorod (Hungarian: Homoród-patak) is a right tributary of the river Mureș in Romania. It discharges into the Mureș near Geoagiu. Its length is 14 km (8.7 mi) and its basin size is 33 km^{2} (13 sq mi).
