= Mărtiniș =

Mărtiniș Homoródszentmárton
- Commune
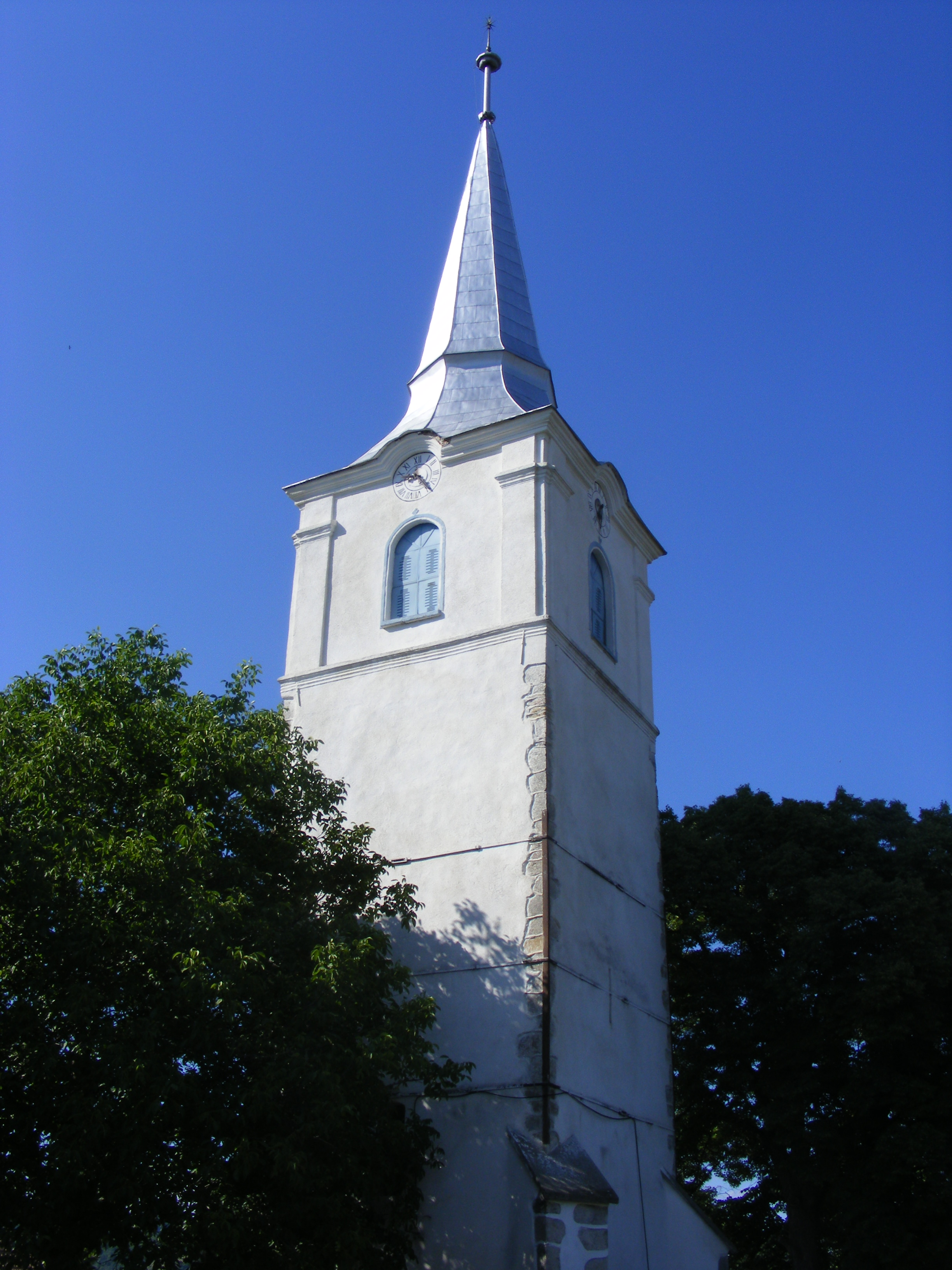
- Unitarian church tower in Mărtiniș

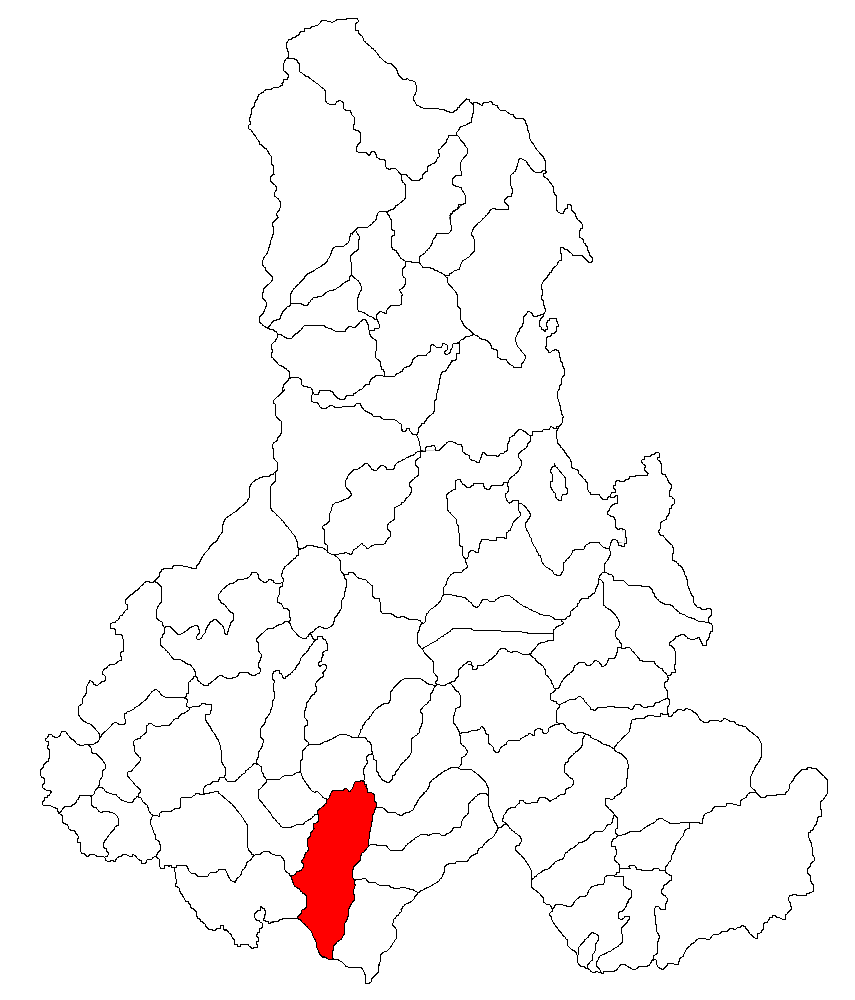
- Location in Harghita County

- Location in Romania
- Coordinates: 46°14′N 25°23′E
- Country: Romania
- County: Harghita

Government
  - Mayor (2020–2024): Attila Jakab (UDMR)
- Area: 80 km^{2} (31 sq mi)
- Elevation: 498 m (1,634 ft)
- Population (2021-12-01): 2,817
  - Density: 35/km^{2} (91/sq mi)
- Time zone: UTC+02:00 (EET)
  - Summer (DST): UTC+03:00 (EEST)
- Postal code: 537175
- Area code: +(40) 266
- Vehicle reg.: HR
- Website: www.homorodszentmarton.ro

Mărtiniș (Hungarian: Homoródszentmárton; Hungarian pronunciation: [ˈhomoroːdsɛnmaːrton], meaning "St. Martin of Homorod") is a commune in Harghita County, Romania. It is composed of twelve villages: Aldea (Abásfalva), Bădeni (Bágy), Călugăreni (Homoródremete), Chinușu (Kénos), Comănești (Homoródkeményfalva), Ghipeș (Gyepes), Locodeni (Lókod), Mărtiniș, Orășeni (Városfalva), Petreni (Homoródszentpéter), Rareș (Recsenyéd), and Sânpaul (Homoródszentpál).

== Geography ==
The commune lies in the Székely Land, an ethno-cultural region in eastern Transylvania. It is situated at the southeastern edge of the Transylvanian Plateau, at an altitude of 498 m (1,634 ft), on the banks of the river Homorodul Mare.

Mărtiniș is located in the southern part of Harghita County, 17 km (11 mi) southeast of Odorheiu Secuiesc and 44 km (27 mi) southwest of the county seat, Miercurea Ciuc, on the border with Brașov County. It is crossed by county roads DJ 131, 132A, and 133. The route of the Via Transilvanica long-distance trail passes through the villages of Călugăreni, Ghipeș, Mărtiniș, Rareș, and Sânpaul.

== History ==
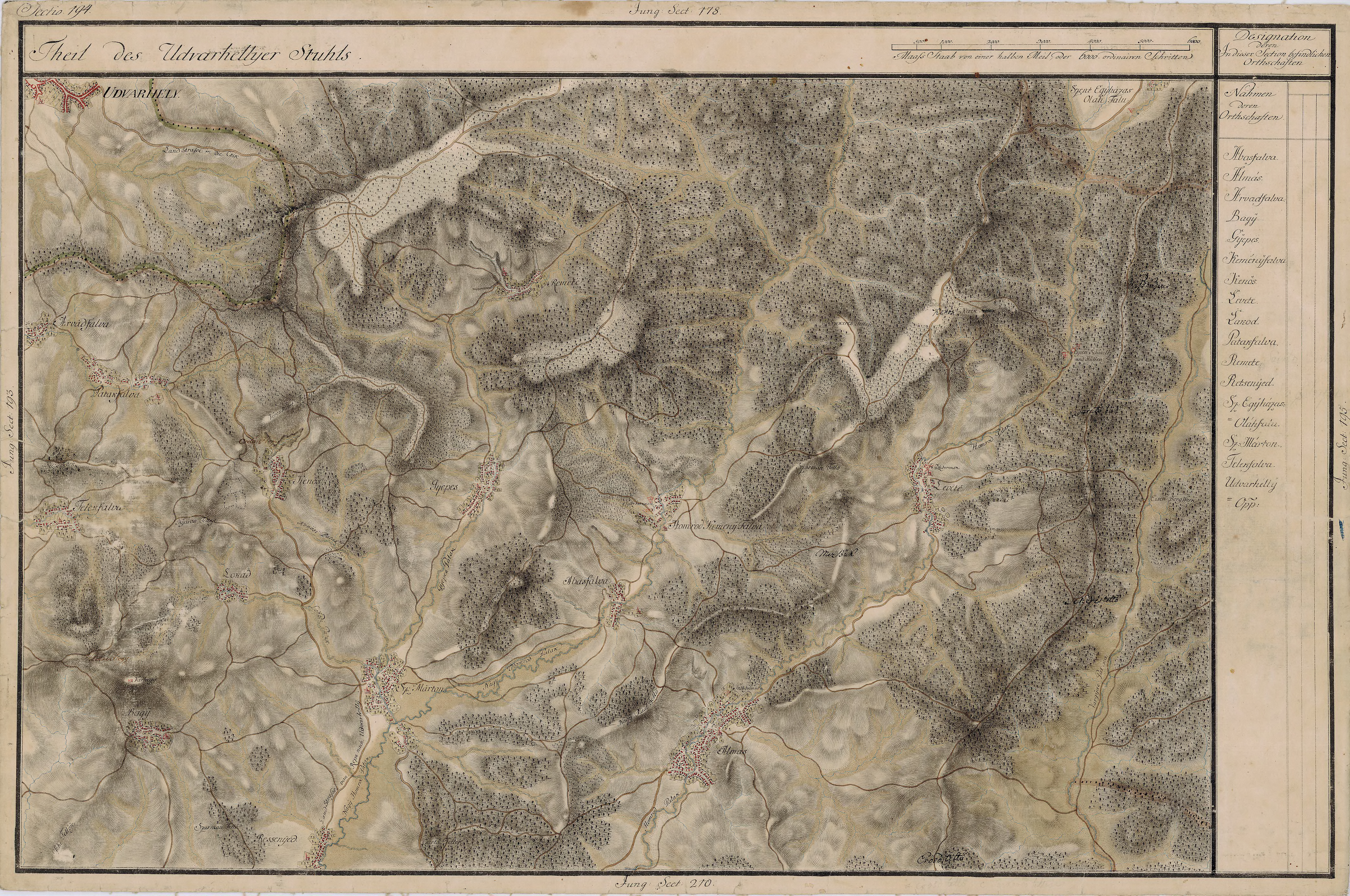
The villages on the Josephinische Landaufnahme, 1769–1773

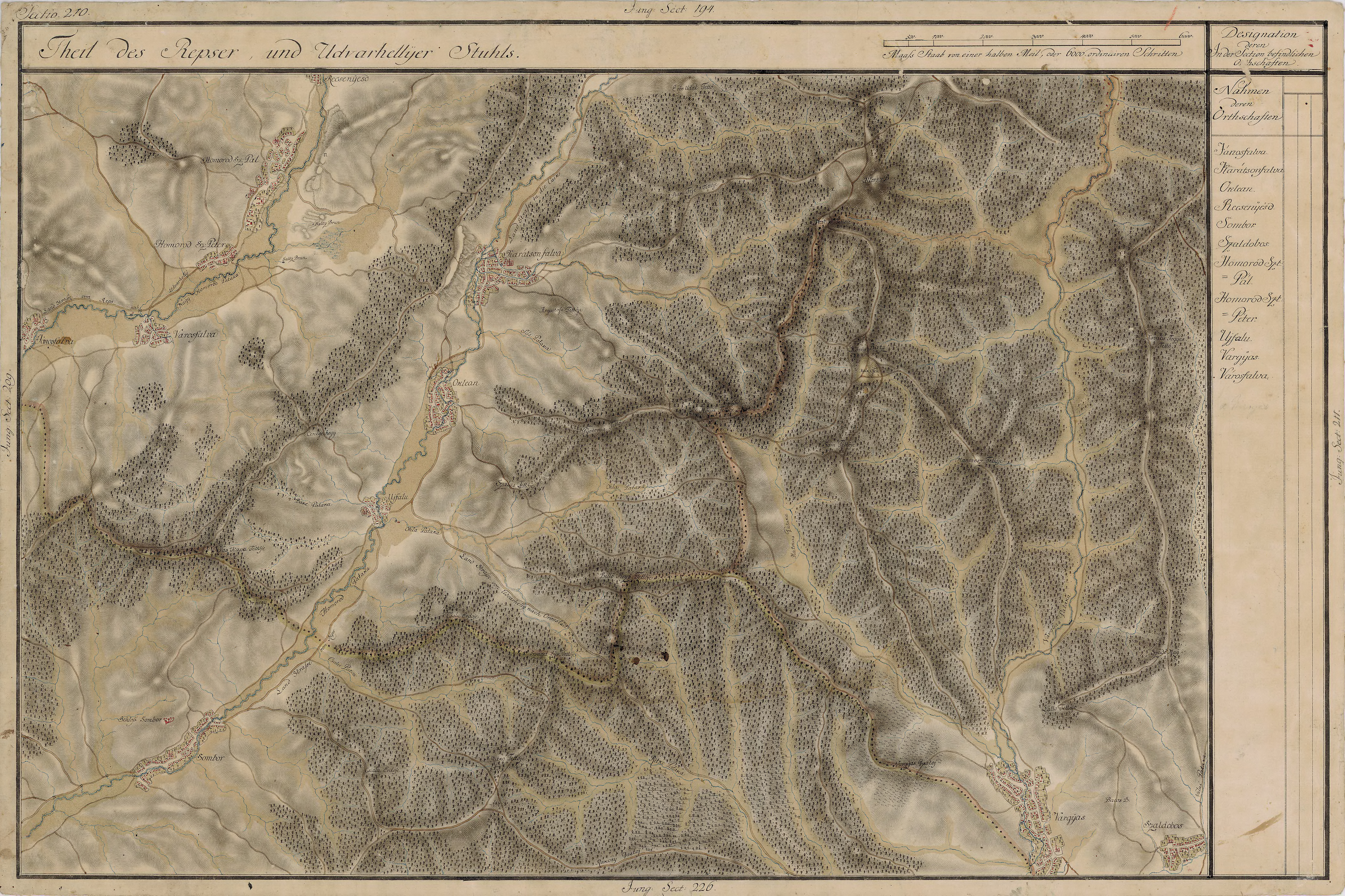
The villages on the Josephinische Landaufnahme, 1769–1773

The village seems to have been inhabited already in prehistoric times as a Neolithic ax and an urn was found in the outskirts of the village some decades ago. Roman coins were also unearthed in the village and a small lake reminiscent of the place of an abandoned salt mine suggest that it was also inhabited in Roman times

The village gained its name, when King Géza II of Hungary founded settlements in the Great-Homorod Valley in the middle of the 12th century. The first settlement is thought to be destroyed by the Mongols in 1241. This is supported by the fact that all the churches of the Homorod area were built in a style which is characteristic for the era following the Mongol Invasion. The village is first recorded in a diploma from 1333 when a sacerdos de Sancto Martino was mentioned. In 1487, it is recorded as Zenthmarton, while in 1636, it appears already as Homorod-Szent-Marton. Its Romanian name derives from the Hungarian one and it had at first been Homorod-Sânmărtin and was later changed to the current official name. Its medieval church consecrated in honour of St Martin was built in the 13th century and was altered in the 15th century in late-Gothic style. As the village suffered a Tartar attack in 1613, the church was surrounded by a fortified wall strengthened by six towers. Between 1714 and 1719, the population was struck by plague. Although, the mediaeval church was pulled down in 1888, the gate-tower of the fortified wall was spared and it now serves as the bell tower of the new Unitarian church built in 1889.

The villages forming the commune administratively belonged to Udvarhelyszék, then, from 1876 until 1918 to Homoród district of Udvarhely County in the Kingdom of Hungary. In the aftermath of World War I and the Hungarian–Romanian War of 1918–1919, it passed under Romanian administration; after the Treaty of Trianon of 1920, like the rest of Transylvania, it became part of the Kingdom of Romania. During the interwar period, Mărtiniș fell within plasa Ocland in Odorhei County. In 1940, the Second Vienna Award granted Northern Transylvania to Hungary and the commune was held by Hungary until September 1944. The territory of Northern Transylvania remained under Soviet military administration until March 9, 1945, after which it became again part of Romania. Between 1952 and 1960, the commune fell within the Magyar Autonomous Region, between 1960 and 1968 the Mureș-Magyar Autonomous Region. In 1968, the region was abolished, and since then, the commune has been part of Harghita County.

== Demographics ==
At the 2011 census, the commune had a population of 2,838; out of them, 97% were Hungarians, 1.3% were Romanians, and 0.2% were Roma. 67% of the commune population were Unitarian, 14% Reformed, and 13% Roman Catholic. At the 2021 census, Mărtiniș had a population of 2,817; of those, 93.43% were Hungarians.

== Landmarks ==
- The Unitarian Church was built in 1889, however, the gate-tower of the 17th century fortified wall was turned into its bell tower.
- The Reformed Church was built in 1804 on a plot donated by the Bíró and Ugron families.
- In the village can be found the largest mansion house of the area, the mansion of the Bíró family. Chronicles from the Middle Ages already record a mansion house on the site. There is a vaulted cellar under the building built of stone, brick and hot lime which successfully resisted the storms of history. Several rooms, including a large dining-room can be seen in the building. The Ugron family inherited the mansion in the second half of the 18th century, and it was between 1780 and 1790 that the building gained its current appearance in Rococo style.
- The family vault of the Bíró-family is south-east of the village in a small settlement called Bükkfalva.

== Notable people ==
- Jakab Molnár (1926–1991), writer
- Elemér Mezei (1954-), mathematician
- Viktor Román (1937–1995), sculptor
- János Szentmártoni Bodó (1590 or 1595 – 1648), poet
- Berta Kelemenné Zathureczky (1855–1924), writer
- Aladár Zoltán (1929–1978), composer

== Twinnings ==
The commune is twinned with:

- Dunavecse, Hungary
- Zsámbék, Hungary

== See also ==
- Castra of Sânpaul
