= Castellum of Băile Homorod =

- Location within Romania
- 46.3500°N 25.4681°E
- Location: Băile Homorod, Harghita, Romania

History
- Founded: 2nd century AD
- Abandoned: 2nd century AD

Site notes
- Condition: Ruined

The fortification is located in Băile Homorod, Romania, and it has as defense: ditch, berm and rampart.

== See also ==
- List of castra
