= Ulieș =

Commune in Harghita County, Romania

Ulieș Kányád
- Commune
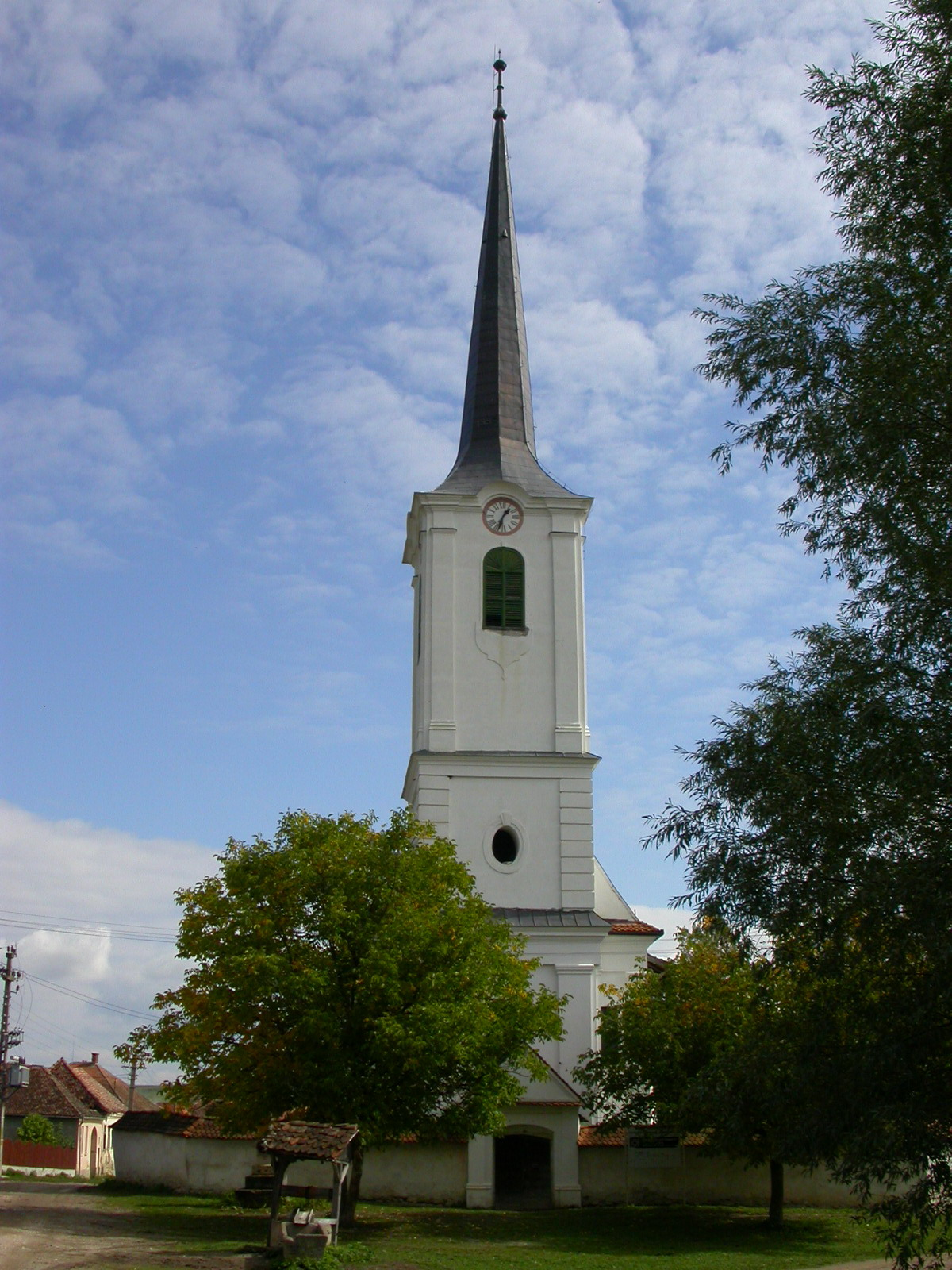
- Reformed church in Daia

- Flag Coat of arms

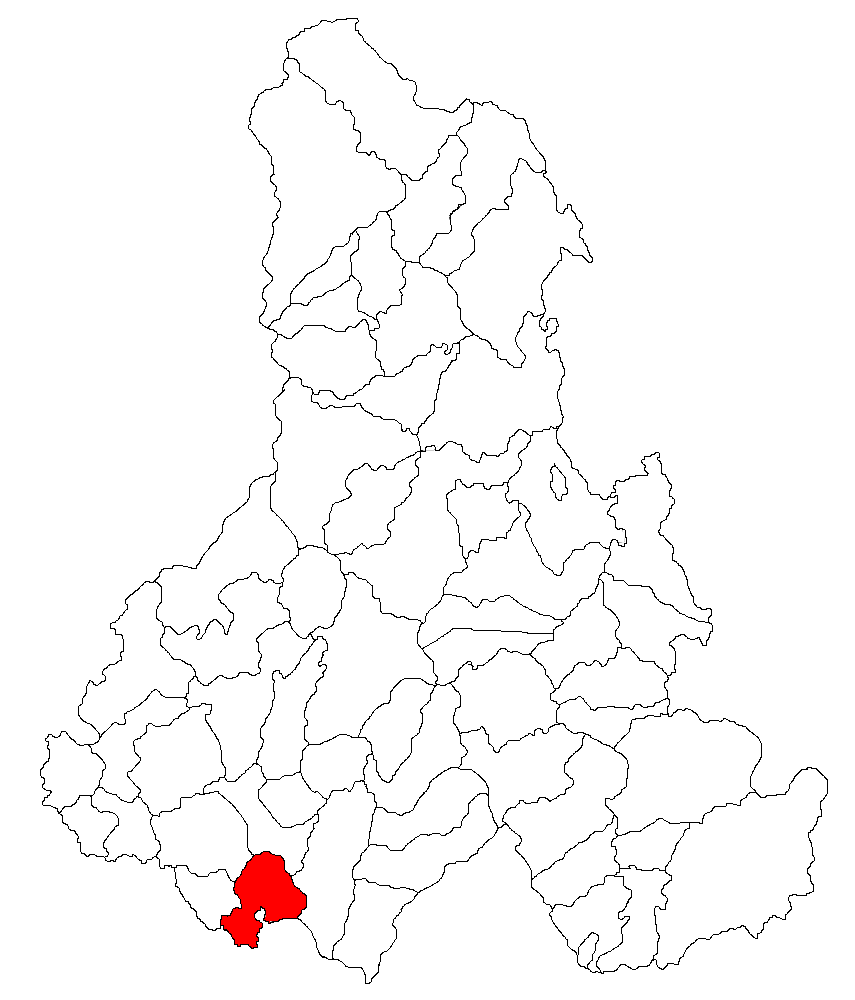
- Location in Harghita County

- Location in Romania
- Coordinates: 46°13′N 25°14′E
- Country: Romania
- County: Harghita

Government
  - Mayor (2020–2024): Sándor György (UDMR)
- Area: 65.29 km^{2} (25.21 sq mi)
- Elevation: 560 m (1,840 ft)
- Population (2021-12-01): 1,068
  - Density: 16.36/km^{2} (42.37/sq mi)
- Time zone: UTC+02:00 (EET)
  - Summer (DST): UTC+03:00 (EEST)
- Postal code: 537340
- Area code: +(40) 266
- Vehicle reg.: HR
- Website: www.comunaulies.ro

Ulieș (Hungarian: Kányád) is a commune in Harghita County, Romania. It lies in the Székely Land, an ethno-cultural region in eastern Transylvania. The commune is composed of eight villages: Daia (Székelydálya), Iașu (Jásfalva), Ighiu (Ége), Nicolești (Miklósfalva), Obrănești (Abránfalva), Petecu (Petek), Ulieș, and Vasileni (Homoródszentlászló).

The route of the Via Transilvanica long-distance trail passes through the villages of Daia, Iașu, and Ulieș.

== Demographics ==
The commune has an absolute Székely Hungarian majority. According to the 2002 census it had a population of 1,273, of which 98.59% or 1,255 were Hungarians. At the 2011 census, the commune had 1,193 inhabitants; of those, 91.03% were Hungarians, 4.78% Roma, and 1.17% Romanians. At the 2021 census, Ulieș had a population of 1,068, of which 90.17% were Hungarians.
