= Cața =

Cața Kaca
- Commune
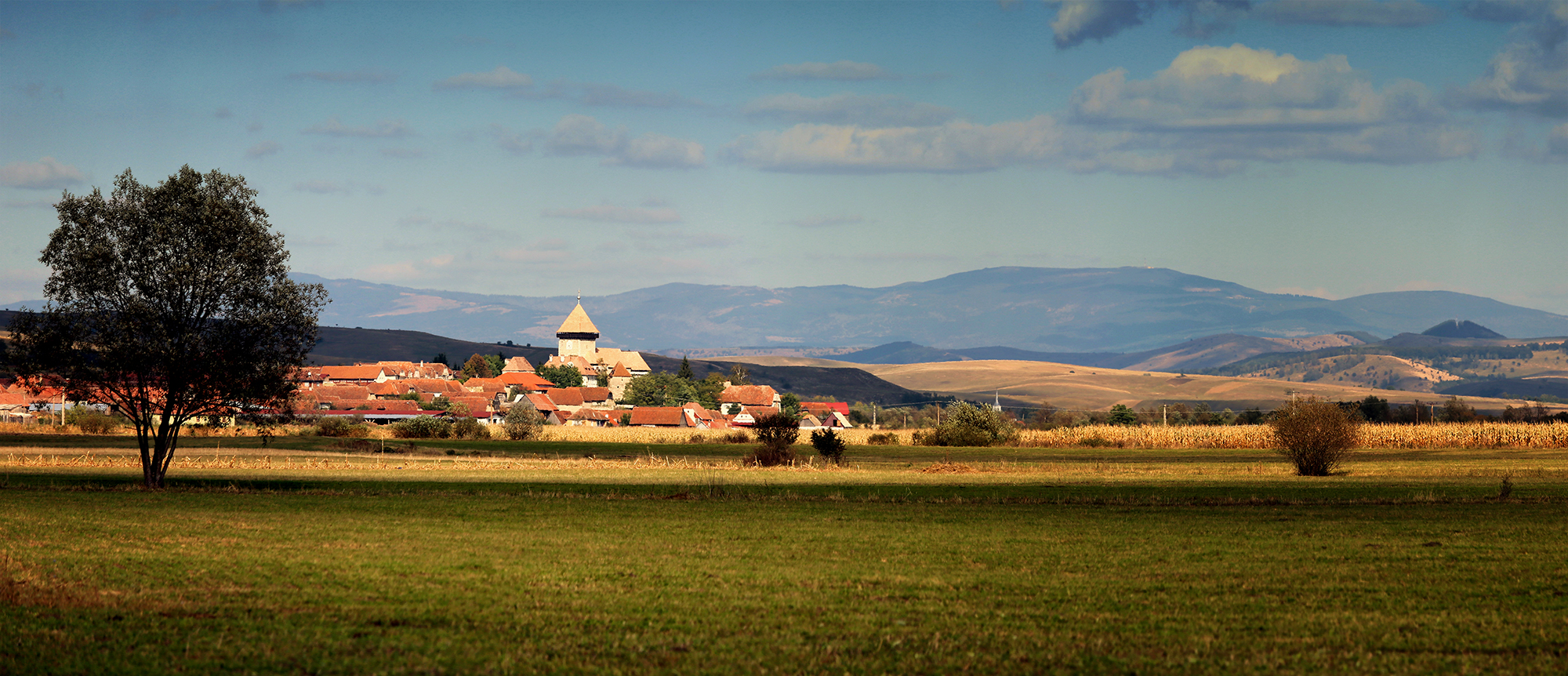
- View of Drăușeni

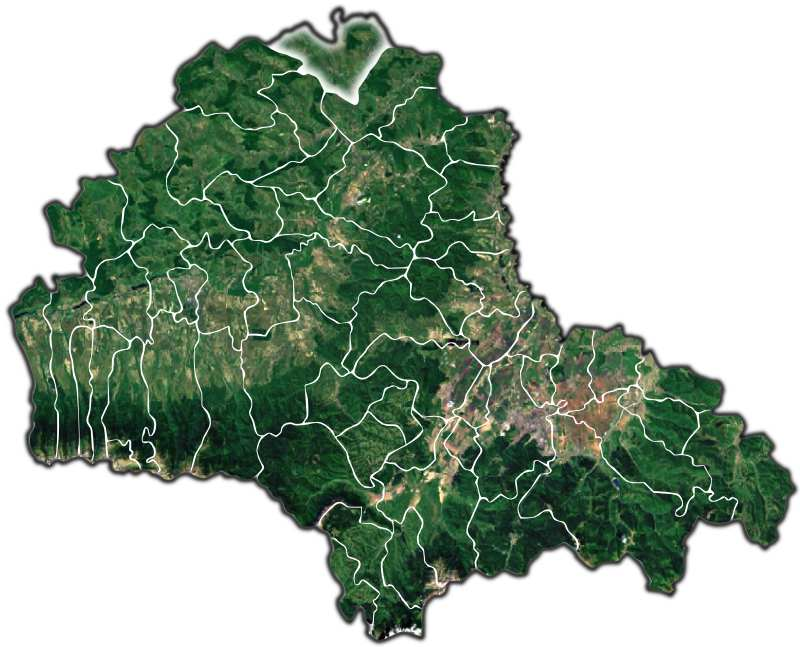
- Location within the county

- Location in Romania
- Coordinates: 46°5′N 25°16′E
- Country: Romania
- County: Brașov

Government
  - Mayor (2020–2024): Liviu Ioan Vocilă (PNL)
- Area: 118.12 km^{2} (45.61 sq mi)
- Elevation: 464 m (1,522 ft)
- Population (2021-12-01): 2,571
  - Density: 21.77/km^{2} (56.37/sq mi)
- Time zone: UTC+02:00 (EET)
  - Summer (DST): UTC+03:00 (EEST)
- Postal code: 507040
- Area code: +(40) x59
- Vehicle reg.: BV
- Website: www.comunacata.ro

Cața (German: Katzendorf; Hungarian: Kaca) is a commune in Brașov County, Transylvania, Romania. It is composed of five villages: Beia (Meeburg; Homoródbene), Cața, Drăușeni (Draas; Homoróddaróc), Ionești (Eisdorf; Homoródjánosfalva), and Paloș (Königsdorf; Pálos).

The commune is located in the northernmost part of the county, on the border with Harghita and Mureș counties. Cața village—the administrative center of the commune—is 69 km (43 mi) northwest of Brașov (the county seat) and 36 km (22 mi) south of Odorheiu Secuiesc.

Historical population
Year	Pop.	±%
1850	4,523	—
1920	4,709	+4.1%
1941	4,263	−9.5%
1977	3,359	−21.2%
1992	2,491	−25.8%
2002	2,570	+3.2%
2011	2,463	−4.2%
2021	2,571	+4.4%
Source: Census data

At the 2011 census, Cața had 2,463 inhabitants; of those, 44.9% were Romanians, 30.9% Hungarians, and 23.4% Roma. At the 2021 census, the commune had a population of 2,571, of which 42.75% were Romanians, 32.59% Roma, and 18.79% Hungarians.

There are three fortified churches in the commune, at Cața, Beia, and Drăușeni.

The famous Caru' cu Bere restaurant in Bucharest was originally opened as a brewery in 1879 by Ioan Căbășan and his nephews, Ion, Gheorghe, and Nicolae Mircea, all coming from Cața.

== Gallery ==
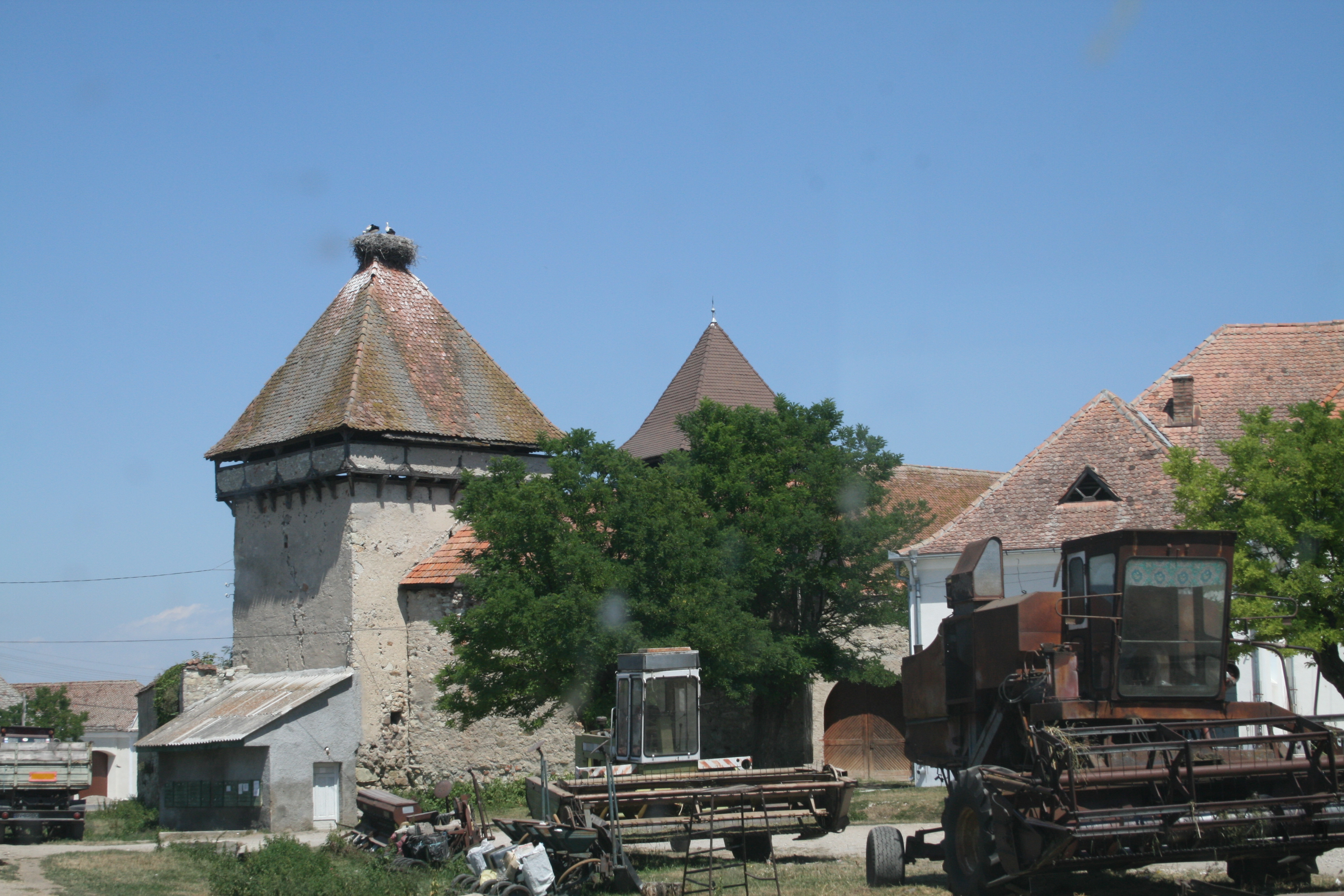
Evangelical Lutheran fortified Transylvanian Saxon church of Cața

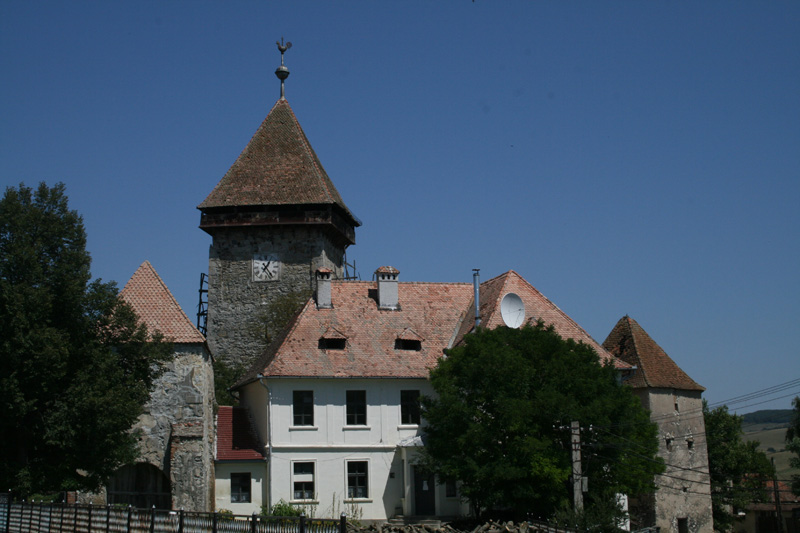
Evangelical Lutheran fortified Transylvanian Saxon church of Drăușeni

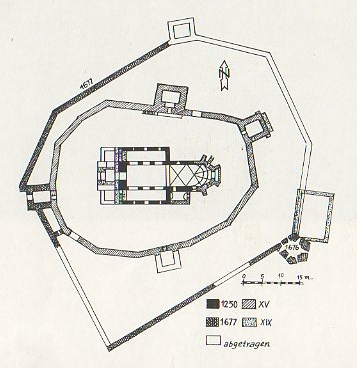
The plan of the Evangelical Lutheran Transylvanian Saxon fortified church in Cața

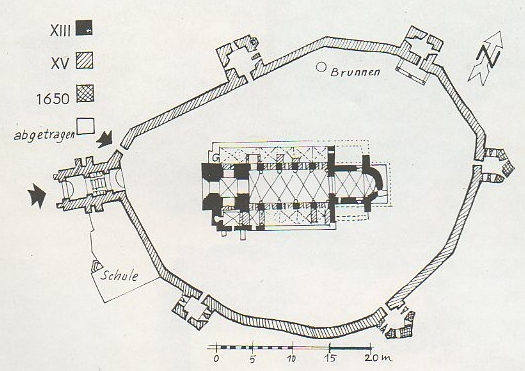
The plan of the Evangelical Lutheran Transylvanian Saxon fortified church in Drăușeni
