= Vlăhița =

Vlăhița Szentegyháza
- Town
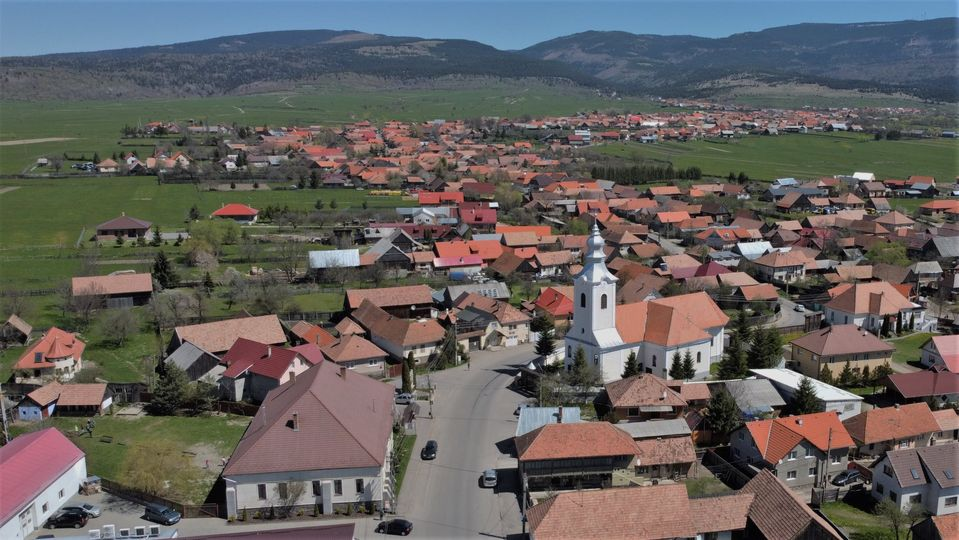
- Vlăhița church square

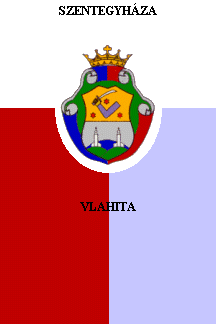
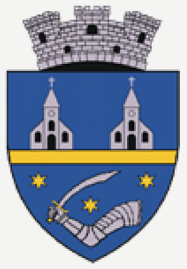
- Flag Coat of arms

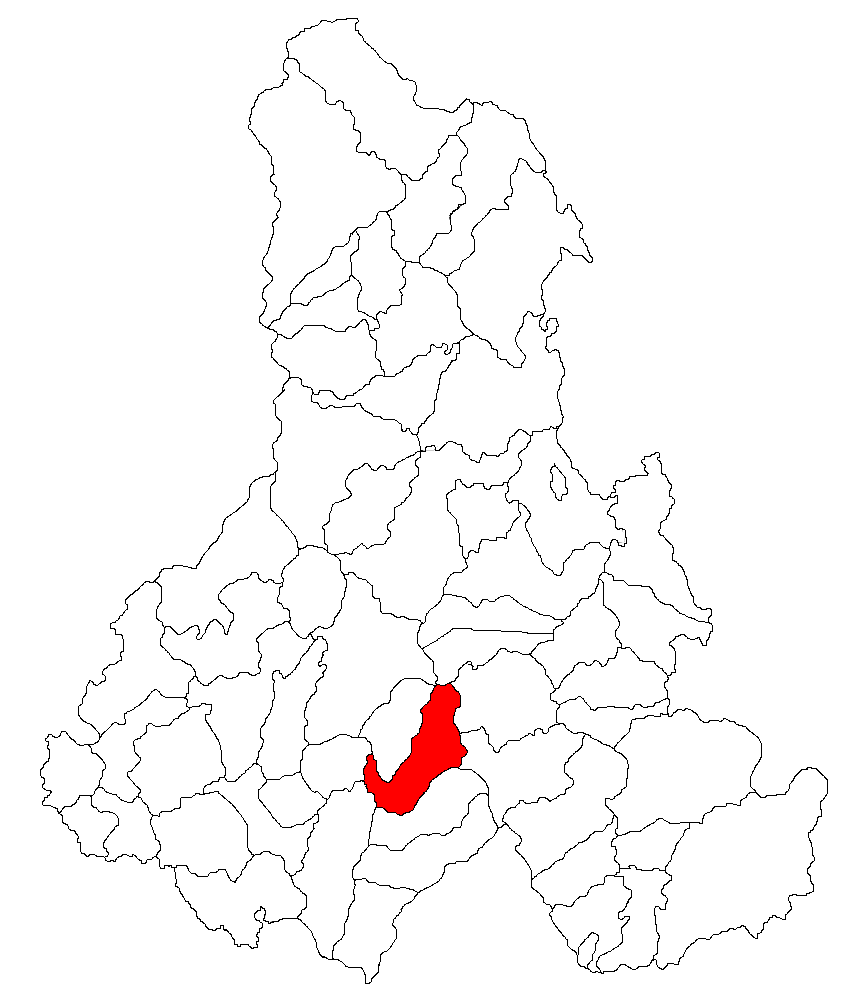
- Location in Harghita County

- Location in Romania
- Coordinates: 46°21′0″N 25°31′48″E
- Country: Romania
- County: Harghita

Government
  - Mayor (2024–2028): Csaba Lőrincz (AMT)
- Area: 75.25 km^{2} (29.05 sq mi)
- Elevation: 860 m (2,820 ft)
- Population (2021-12-01): 6,468
  - Density: 85.95/km^{2} (222.6/sq mi)
- Time zone: UTC+02:00 (EET)
  - Summer (DST): UTC+03:00 (EEST)
- Postal code: 535500
- Area code: (+40) 02 66
- Vehicle reg.: HR
- Website: www.primariavlahita.ro

Vlăhița (Hungarian: Szentegyháza, pronounced [ˈsɛntɛchaːzɒ], until 1899 Szentegyházas-Oláhfalu) is a town in Harghita County, Romania. It lies in the Székely Land, an ethno-cultural region in eastern Transylvania.

The town administers two villages: Băile Homorod (Homoródfürdő) and Minele Lueta (Lövétebánya). Its Romanian name is of Slavic origin, meaning "little Vlach", while its Hungarian name means "Church of the Saint".

== Location ==
Vlăhița is situated on national road DN13, midway between Odorheiu Secuiesc and the county seat, Miercurea Ciuc. Its 860 m (2,820 ft) altitude makes it the highest town in Harghita County.

== History ==
In Roman times a Roman fort was functioning in nearby Băile Homorod. The town was part of the Székely Land area of the historical Transylvania province. It belonged to Udvarhelyszék until the administrative reform of Transylvania in 1876, when it fell within the Udvarhely County of Austria-Hungary. After the Hungarian–Romanian War of 1919 and the Treaty of Trianon of 1920, it became part of Romania and fell within plasa Odorhei of Odorhei County during the interwar period. In 1940, the Second Vienna Award granted Northern Transylvania to Hungary and the town was held by Hungary until the fall of 1944, when Romanian and Soviet troops regained control during World War II. After a brief Soviet occupation, the Romanian administration returned in March 1945. In 1950, after Communist Romania was established, Vlăhița became part of the Odorhei Raion of Stalin Region. Between 1952 and 1960, the town fell within the Magyar Autonomous Region, between 1960 and 1968 the Mureș-Magyar Autonomous Region. In 1968, the region was abolished, and since then, the town has been part of Harghita County.

== Demographics ==
Historical population
Year	Pop.	±%
1977	6,636	—
1992	7,667	+15.5%
2002	7,392	−3.6%
2011	6,820	−7.7%
2021	6,468	−5.2%
Source: Census data

At the 2011 census, the town had a total population of 6,820 of which 6,749 (98.96%) were Székely Hungarians, making it the town with the highest proportion of Hungarians in Romania. At the 2021 census, Vlăhița had a population of 6,468; of those, 94.12% were Hungarians.

== Culture ==
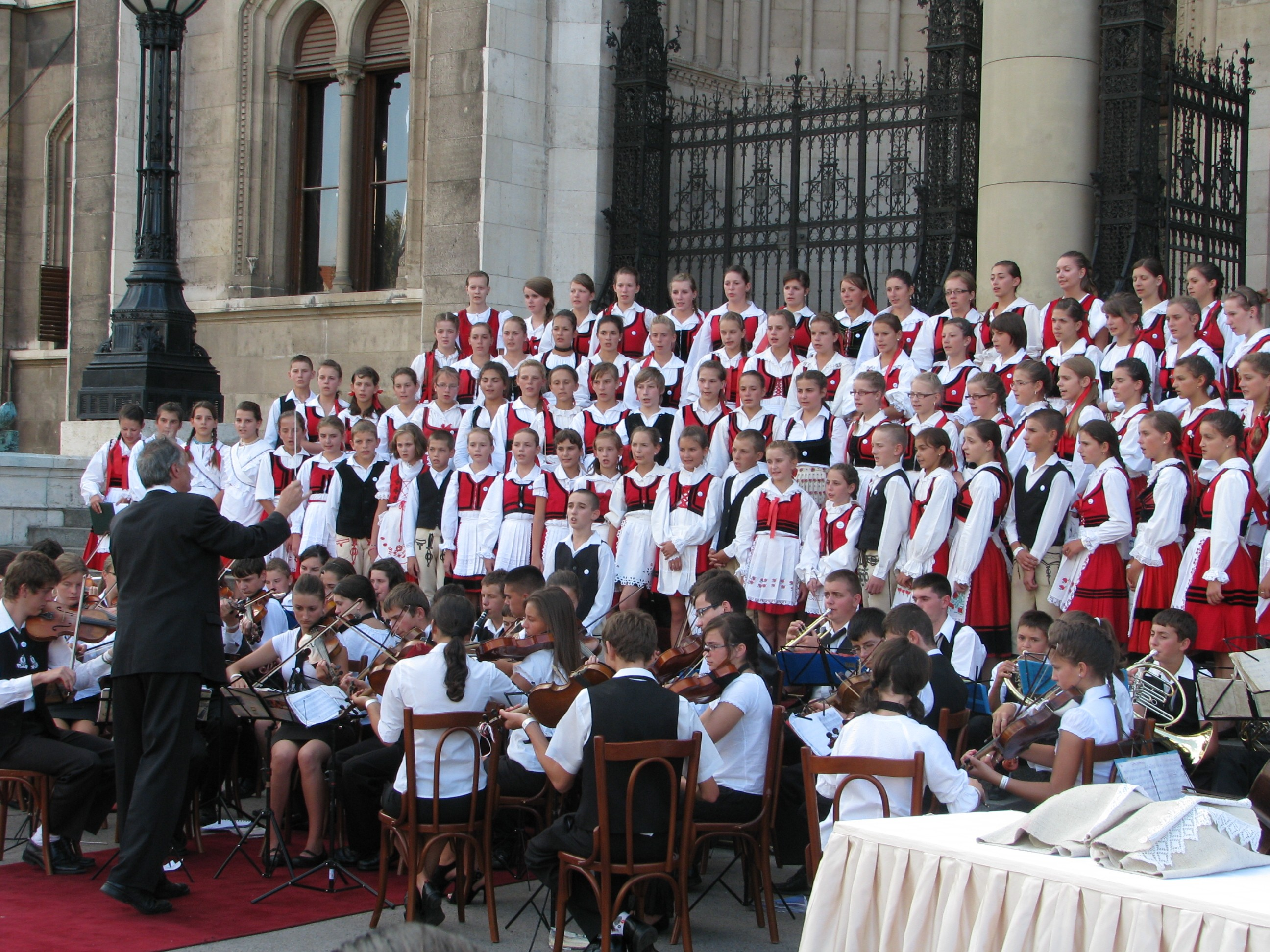
The Children's Orchestra

The town is famous for its Children's Orchestra (Filarmonica de copii/Gyermekfilharmónia), in which more than 140 youngsters sing and play instruments.

== Twin town ==
- Szarvas, Hungary (1994)
