= Homorod (Homorod) =

- Location within Romania

Location
- Country: Romania
- Counties: Brașov County
- Villages: Homorod

Physical characteristics
- Source: Confluence of headwaters Homorodul Mare and Homorodul Mic
  - coordinates: 46.0375°N 25.2859°E
- Mouth: Olt
  - location: Ungra
  - coordinates: 45.9901°N 25.2800°E
- Length: 8 km (5.0 mi)
- Basin size: 855 km^{2} (330 sq mi)

Basin features
- Progression: Olt→ Danube→ Black Sea
- Tributaries
  - left: Homorodul Mic, Slatina
  - right: Homorodul Mare, Cozd
- River code: VIII.1.71

The Homorod (Hungarian: Homoród) is a right tributary of the river Olt in Romania. It is formed at the confluence of its headwaters Homorodul Mare and Homorodul Mic, in the village Homorod. It discharges into the Olt in Ungra. Its length is 8 km (62 km), including the Homorodul Mare. The basin size of the Homorod is 855 km^{2} (330 sq mi).
