= List of castra in Romania =

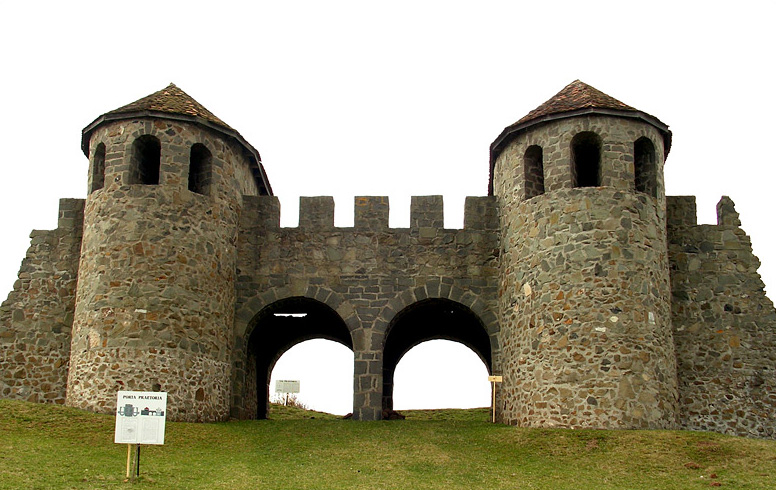
Reconstructed Porta Praetoria at Porolissum, Roman Dacia (modern Romania)

Roman castra in Romania were forts built by the Roman army following the conquests of Moesia, Scythia Minor and Dacia, parts of which are now found in the territory of modern Romania. Many of these castra were part of various limes (a border defense or delimiting system). The vast majority of these forts were built for garrisons of Auxilia of non-citizen regiments of nominally 500 men.

The castra not yet identified, have the name of the modern location in italics and parenthesis (i.e. (Pietroasele)), while major ones are in bold (i.e. Porolissum).

Picture	Name	Modern City	Limes	Area (ha)	Founded	Abandoned	Administrative Unit	Modern Province	County
	Abruttus	Abrud		0.2			Dacia Apulensis	Transylvania	Alba
	Acidava	Enoșești					Dacia Malvensis	Oltenia	Olt
	Ad Pannonios	Teregova		1.4			Dacia Apulensis	Banat	Caraș-Severin
	Aizis	Fârliug					Dacia Apulensis	Banat	Caraș-Severin
	Altenum	Oltina	Moesiarum	2			Moesia Inferior	Dobrudja	Constanța
	Amutria (Ad Mutriam)	Cătunele		1.7			Dacia Malvensis	Oltenia	Gorj
	Angustia	Brețcu	Porolissensis?	2.5			Dacia Apulensis	Transylvania	Covasna
Image of Porta Principalis Dextra at castra Apulum, Roman Dacia (modern Romania)	**Apulum**	Alba Iulia		16			Dacia Apulensis	Transylvania	Alba
	Arcidava	Vărădia		2.6	106		Dacia Apulensis	Banat	Caraș-Severin
Ruins of ancient Arrubium	Arrubium	Macin	Moesiarum				Moesia Inferior	Dobrudja	Tulcea
Image of castra Arutela, Roman Dacia (modern Romania)	Arutela	Căciulata	Alutanus		138		Dacia Malvensis	Oltenia	Vâlcea
	Bacaucis	Foeni					Dacia Apulensis	Banat	Timiș
	Bersobis	Berzovia		20			Dacia Apulensis	Banat	Caraș-Severin
Ruins of castra Buridava	Buridava	Râmnicu Vâlcea	Alutanus				Dacia Malvensis	Oltenia	Vâlcea
Image of castra Capidava, Moesia (modern Romania)	**Capidava**	Capidava	Moesiarum	1.33			Moesia Inferior	Dobrudja	Constanța
	Caput Bubali	Delinești					Dacia Apulensis	Banat	Caraș-Severin
	Caput Stenarum	Boița	Alutanus	0.2			Dacia Apulensis	Transylvania	Sibiu
	Carsium	Hârșova	Moesiarum				Moesia Inferior	Dobrudja	Constanța
	Castra Traiana	Dăești	Alutanus				Dacia Malvensis	Oltenia	Vâlcea
	Castranova	Castranova					Dacia Malvensis	Oltenia	Dolj
	Castrum Stenarum	Sighișoara		2.4			Dacia Apulensis	Transylvania	Mureș
	Cedonia	Sibiu					Dacia Apulensis	Transylvania	Sibiu
	Centum Putei	Surducu Mare		1.7			Dacia Apulensis	Banat	Caraș-Severin
	Certinae	Romita	Porolissensis	4.25			Dacia Porolissensis	Transylvania	Sălaj
	Cumidava	Râșnov	Transalutanus	1.2			Dacia Apulensis	Transylvania	Brașov
	Dierna	Orșova	Moesiarum	0.35			Dacia Malvensis	Oltenia	Mehedinți
Image of castra Dinogetia, Moesia (modern Romania)	Dinogetia	Garvăn	Moesiarum				Moesia Inferior	Dobrudja	Tulcea
Image of castra Drobeta, Roman Dacia (modern Romania)	**Drobeta**	Drobeta Turnu Severin	Moesiarum	1.6	103		Dacia Malvensis	Oltenia	Mehedinți
Image of castra Germisara, Roman Dacia (modern Romania)	Germisara	Geoagiu					Dacia Apulensis	Transylvania	Hunedoara
	(Jidava)	Schitu Golești		1.3			Dacia Malvensis	Muntenia	Argeș|-
	Largina	Românași	Porolissensis	2			Dacia Porolissensis	Transylvania	Sălaj
	Media	Mediaș					Dacia Apulensis	Transylvania	Sibiu
	Micia	Vețel					Dacia Apulensis	Transylvania	Hunedoara
	Morisena	Sânnicolau Mare	Marisiensis				Dacia Apulensis	Banat	Timiș
Ruins of ancient Napoca	**Napoca**	Cluj-Napoca			106		Dacia Porolissensis	Transylvania	Cluj
	Noviodunum	Isaccea	Moesiarum				Moesia Inferior	Dobrudja	Tulcea
	Optatiana	Sutoru	Porolissensis				Dacia Porolissensis	Transylvania	Sălaj
	Pelendava	Craiova					Dacia Malvensis	Oltenia	Dolj
Image of a Thasos amphora from Piroboridava, Moesia (modern Romania)	Piroboridava	Poiana					Moesia Inferior?	Moldova	Galați
	Pons Aluti	Ionești	Alutanus				Dacia Malvensis	Oltenia	Vâlcea
	Pons Augusti	Voislova		0.17			Dacia Apulensis	Banat	Caraș-Severin
	Pons Vetus	Câineni	Alutanus				Dacia Malvensis	Oltenia	Vâlcea
Image of Porta Praetoria at castra Porolissum, Roman Dacia (modern Romania)	**Porolissum**	Moigrad-Porolissum	Porolissensis	6.9	106		Dacia Porolissensis	Transylvania	Sălaj
Image of castra Potaissa, Roman Dacia (modern Romania)	**Potaissa**	Turda		23.37	107		Dacia Porolissensis	Transylvania	Cluj
	Praetorium	Mehadia		1.6			Dacia Apulensis	Banat	Caraș-Severin
	Praetorium	Copăceni	Alutanus				Dacia Malvensis	Oltenia	Vâlcea
	Resculum	Bologa	Porolissensis	2.6			Dacia Porolissensis	Transylvania	Cluj
	**Romula**	Reșca					Dacia Malvensis	Oltenia	Olt
Image of medieval castle from Rupea, build on top of castra Rupes, Roman Dacia (modern Romania)	Rupes	Rupea	Porolissensis?				Dacia Apulensis	Transylvania	Brașov
	Rusidava	Drăgășani	Alutanus				Dacia Malvensis	Oltenia	Vâlcea
	Sacidava	Rasova	Moesiarum				Moesia Inferior	Dobrudja	Constanța
	Samum	Cășeiu	Porolissensis	2.7	106		Dacia Porolissensis	Transylvania	Cluj
Image of Sucidava, Roman Dacia (modern Romania)	Sucidava	Corabia	Moesiarum				Dacia Malvensis	Oltenia	Olt
	Temesiensis	Timișoara					Dacia Apulensis	Banat	Timiș
	Tibiscum	Jupa		5.4			Dacia Apulensis	Banat	Caraș-Severin
Image of castra Troesmis, Moesia (modern Romania)	**Troesmis**	Turcoaia	Moesiarum				Moesia Inferior	Dobrudja	Tulcea
	Ulmetum	Pantelimon					Moesia Inferior	Dobrudja	Constanța
Image of Ulpia Traiana Sarmizegetusa, Roman Dacia (modern Romania)	**Ulpia Traiana Sarmizegetusa**	Sarmizegetusa					Dacia Apulensis	Transylvania	Hunedoara
	(Albești)	Albești					Dacia Malvensis	Oltenia	Olt
	(Albota)	Albota	Transalutanus	0.4			Dacia Malvensis	Muntenia	Argeș
	(Apoldu de Jos)	Apoldu de Jos					Dacia Apulensis	Transylvania	Sibiu
	(Arad)	Lipova	Marisiensis				Dacia Apulensis	Banat	Arad
	(Basarabi-Murfatlar)	Basarabi					Moesia Inferior	Dobrudja	Constanța
	(Băneasa)	Băneasa	Transalutanus	2.2			Dacia Malvensis	Muntenia	Teleorman
	(Bănița)	Bănița		7.4			Dacia Apulensis	Transylvania	Hunedoara
	(Boroșneu Mare)	Boroșneu Mare	Porolissensis?	2.57			Dacia Apulensis	Transylvania	Covasna
	(Brașov – Șprenghi)	Brașov	Transalutanus				Dacia Apulensis	Transylvania	Brașov
	(Brâncovenești)	Brâncovenești	Porolissensis	2.55			Dacia Porolissensis	Transylvania	Mureș
	(Breznița-Ocol)	Breznița-Ocol					Dacia Malvensis	Oltenia	Mehedinți
	(Brusturi)	Brusturi	Porolissensis				Dacia Porolissensis	Transylvania	Sălaj
	(Bucium)	Bucium		2.56			Dacia Apulensis	Transylvania	Hunedoara
	(Buciumi)	Buciumi	Porolissensis	2.2			Dacia Porolissensis	Transylvania	Sălaj
	(Bulci)	Bulci	Marisiensis				Dacia Apulensis	Banat	Arad
	(Bumbești-Jiu 1)	Bumbești-Jiu					Dacia Malvensis	Oltenia	Gorj
	(Bumbești-Jiu 2)	Bumbești-Jiu		1.44			Dacia Malvensis	Oltenia	Gorj
	(Bumbești-Jiu 3)	Bumbești-Jiu		2.8			Dacia Malvensis	Oltenia	Gorj
	(Călugăreni)	Călugăreni	Porolissensis?	2.2			Dacia Apulensis	Transylvania	Mureș
	(Cernavodă)	Cernavodă	Moesiarum				Moesia Inferior	Dobrudja	Constanța
	(Chitid)	Chitid		3.15			Dacia Apulensis	Transylvania	Hunedoara
	(Cigmău)	Cigmău		3.8			Dacia Apulensis	Transylvania	Hunedoara
	(Cincșor)	Cincșor		2.5			Dacia Apulensis	Transylvania	Brașov
	(Cioroiu Nou)	Cioroiu Nou					Dacia Malvensis	Oltenia	Dolj
	(Ciuperceni)	Ciuperceni	Moesiarum Transalutanus	13.6			Dacia Malvensis	Muntenia	Teleorman
	(Colțești)	Colțești					Dacia Apulensis	Transylvania	Alba
	(Comărnicel 1)	Petrila		5.8			Dacia Apulensis	Transylvania	Hunedoara
	(Comărnicel 2)	Petrila		7.8			Dacia Apulensis	Transylvania	Hunedoara
	(Constantin Daicoviciu)	Constantin Daicoviciu					Dacia Apulensis	Banat	Caraș-Severin
	(Cornuțel)	Cornuțel		0.24			Dacia Apulensis	Banat	Caraș-Severin
	(Costești)	Costești		3			Dacia Apulensis	Transylvania	Hunedoara
	(Crâmpoia)	Crâmpoia	Transalutanus	0.7			Dacia Malvensis	Oltenia	Olt
	(Cristești)	Cristești					Dacia Apulensis	Transylvania	Mureș
	(Desa)	Desa					Dacia Malvensis	Oltenia	Dolj
	(Drajna de Sus)	Drajna de Sus					Dacia Malvensis	Muntenia	Prahova
	(Drumul Carului)	Drumul Carului					Dacia Apulensis	Transylvania	Brașov
	(Duleu)	Duleu					Dacia Apulensis	Banat	Caraș-Severin
	(Fâlfani)	Fâlfani	Transalutanus	0.6			Dacia Malvensis	Muntenia	Argeș
	(Federi)	Federi					Dacia Apulensis	Transylvania	Hunedoara
	(Feldioara)	Feldioara		1.5			Dacia Apulensis	Transylvania	Brașov
	(Fizești)	Fizești		0.31			Dacia Apulensis	Transylvania	Hunedoara
Plan of castra from Galați – Tirighina-Bărboși, Moesia (modern Romania)	(Galați – Tirighina-Bărboși)	Galați	Moesiarum				Moesia Inferior	Moldova	Galați
	(Gherla)	Gherla			106		Dacia Porolissensis	Transylvania	Cluj
Image of castra from Gilău, Roman Dacia (modern Romania)	(Gilău)	Gilău		3	106		Dacia Porolissensis	Transylvania	Cluj
	(Gresia)	Gresia		0.3			Dacia Malvensis	Muntenia	Teleorman
	(Grădiștea de Munte)	Grădiștea de Munte		0.4			Dacia Apulensis	Transylvania	Hunedoara
	(Hinova)	Puținei	Moesiarum	0.18			Dacia Malvensis	Oltenia	Mehedinți
	(Hoghiz)	Hoghiz	Porolissensis?	3.6			Dacia Apulensis	Transylvania	Brașov
	(Hunedoara)	Hunedoara					Dacia Apulensis	Transylvania	Hunedoara
	(Ighiu)	Ighiu		0.2			Dacia Apulensis	Transylvania	Alba
	(Ilișua)	Ilișua	Porolissensis	3.3	106		Dacia Porolissensis	Transylvania	Bistrița-Năsăud
	(Inlăceni)	Inlăceni	Porolissensis?	2.07			Dacia Apulensis	Transylvania	Harghita
Plan of Roman fortifications from Insula Bisericuța, Moesia (modern Romania)	(Insula Bisericuța)	Insula Bisericuța/Lake Razelm					Moesia Inferior	Dobrudja	Tulcea
	(Islaz 1)	Islaz	Moesiarum				Dacia Malvensis	Muntenia	Teleorman
	(Islaz 2)	Islaz	Moesiarum				Dacia Malvensis	Muntenia	Teleorman
	(Izbășești)	Izbășești					Dacia Malvensis	Muntenia	Argeș
	(Jac)	Jac	Porolissensis	6			Dacia Porolissensis	Transylvania	Sălaj
	(Jigorul Mare)	Jigorul Mare		7.4			Dacia Apulensis	Transylvania	Hunedoara
	(Lipova)	Lipova	Marisiensis				Dacia Apulensis	Banat	Arad
	(Livezile)	Livezile	Porolissensis	2			Dacia Porolissensis	Transylvania	Bistrița-Năsăud
	(Luncani)	Luncani		2.4			Dacia Apulensis	Transylvania	Hunedoara
	(Moldova Nouă)	Moldova Nouă	Moesiarum				Dacia Apulensis	Banat	Caraș-Severin
	(Negreni)	Negreni	Porolissensis				Dacia Porolissensis	Transylvania	Cluj
	(Ocna Sibiului)	Ocna Sibiului					Dacia Apulensis	Transylvania	Sibiu
	(Odorheiu Secuiesc)	Odorheiu Secuiesc	Porolissensis?				Dacia Apulensis	Transylvania	Harghita
	(Olteni)	Olteni	Porolissensis?	1.3			Dacia Apulensis	Transylvania	Covasna
	(Orheiu Bistriței)	Orheiu Bistriței	Porolissensis	2.9			Dacia Porolissensis	Transylvania	Bistrița-Năsăud
Image of thermae at castra from Pietroasele, Roman Dacia (modern Romania)	(Pietroasele)	Pietroasele		1.95			Dacia Malvensis	Muntenia	Buzău
	(Pietroșani)	Pietroșani	Moesiarum				Dacia Malvensis	Muntenia	Teleorman
	(Pinoasa)	Pinoasa		2.5			Dacia Malvensis	Oltenia	Gorj
	(Pleșa)	Pleșa		3.6			Dacia Malvensis	Oltenia	Gorj
	(Ploiești)	Ploiești					Dacia Malvensis	Muntenia	Prahova
	(Plosca)	Plosca	Moesiarum				Dacia Malvensis	Oltenia	Dolj
	(Pojejena)	Pojejena	Moesiarum	2.7			Dacia Apulensis	Banat	Caraș-Severin
	(Purcăreni)	Purcăreni	Transalutanus	~ 3			Dacia Malvensis	Muntenia	Argeș
	(Putineiu)	Putineiu	Transalutanus	0.28			Dacia Malvensis	Muntenia	Teleorman
	(Puținei)	Puținei					Dacia Malvensis	Oltenia	Mehedinți
	(Răcarii de Jos)	Răcarii de Jos		2.5			Dacia Malvensis	Oltenia	Dolj
	(Rădăcinești)	Rădăcinești					Dacia Malvensis	Oltenia	Vâlcea
	(Războieni-Cetate)	Războieni-Cetate					Dacia Apulensis	Transylvania	Alba
	(Râu Bărbat)	Râu Bărbat		0.96			Dacia Apulensis	Transylvania	Hunedoara
	(Reci / Comalău)	Reci	Transalutanus				Dacia Apulensis	Transylvania	Covasna
	(Roșiorii de Vede 1)	Roșiorii de Vede	Transalutanus				Dacia Malvensis	Muntenia	Teleorman
	(Roșiorii de Vede 2)	Roșiorii de Vede	Transalutanus	0.3			Dacia Malvensis	Muntenia	Teleorman
	(Rucăr)	Rucăr					Dacia Malvensis	Muntenia	Argeș
	(Salcia)	Salcia	Transalutanus	0.28			Dacia Malvensis	Muntenia	Teleorman
	(Săpata de Jos 1)	Săpata de Jos	Transalutanus	1.1			Dacia Malvensis	Muntenia	Argeș
	(Săpata de Jos 2)	Săpata de Jos	Transalutanus	1.6			Dacia Malvensis	Muntenia	Argeș
	(Sărățeni)	Sărățeni	Porolissensis?				Dacia Apulensis	Transylvania	Mureș
	(Sânpaul)	Sânpaul					Dacia Apulensis	Transylvania	Harghita
	(Sântămărie)	Cetatea de Baltă					Dacia Apulensis	Transylvania	Alba
	(Sebeș)	Sebeș					Dacia Apulensis	Transylvania	Alba
	(Sfârleanca)	Sfârleanca					Dacia Malvensis	Muntenia	Prahova
	(Slăveni)	Slăveni					Dacia Malvensis	Oltenia	Olt
	(Stremț)	Stremț					Dacia Apulensis	Transylvania	Alba
	(Svinița)	Svinița	Moesiarum				Dacia Malvensis	Oltenia	Mehedinți
	(Șinca Veche)	Șinca Veche					Dacia Apulensis	Transylvania	Brașov
	(Șugag)	Șugag					Dacia Apulensis	Transylvania	Alba
	(Târgșoru Vechi)	Târgșoru Vechi					Dacia Malvensis	Muntenia	Prahova
	Târnăveni	Târnăveni					Dacia Apulensis	Transylvania	Mureș
	(Tihău)	Tihău	Porolissensis				Dacia Porolissensis	Transylvania	Sălaj
	(Tileagd)	Tileagd					Dacia Porolissensis	Crișana	Bihor
	(Titești)	Titești		0.26			Dacia Malvensis	Oltenia	Vâlcea
	(Urlueni 1)	Urlueni	Transalutanus	1.3			Dacia Malvensis	Muntenia	Argeș
	(Urlueni 2)	Urlueni	Transalutanus	0.8			Dacia Malvensis	Muntenia	Argeș
	(Voinești)	Voinești					Dacia Malvensis	Muntenia	Argeș
	(Zăvoi)	Zăvoi		11.2			Dacia Apulensis	Banat	Caraș-Severin

== See also ==
- List of castra
- List of ancient cities in Thrace and Dacia
- Roman Dacia
- Castra
- Roman legion
- Cohort
- Romanian archaeology
- List of castles in Romania
