= Orăștioara =

Orăștioara may refer to two places in Hunedoara County, Romania:

- Orăștioara de Sus, a commune
- Orăștioara de Jos, a village in Beriu Commune
