= Aizis (castra) =

- Castra of Fârliug; Aigizis, Aigizidava, Aigis, Aixis, Azizis, Zizis
- Location within Romania
- 45.504615°N 21.858438°E
- Location: Ruieni Hill, Fârliug, Caraș-Severin, Romania

Site notes
- Elevation: 176 m (577 ft)
- Condition: Ruined

Aizis was a fort in the Roman province of Dacia, built near the ancient town of Aizis through which Trajan passed at the start of his Second Dacian War.

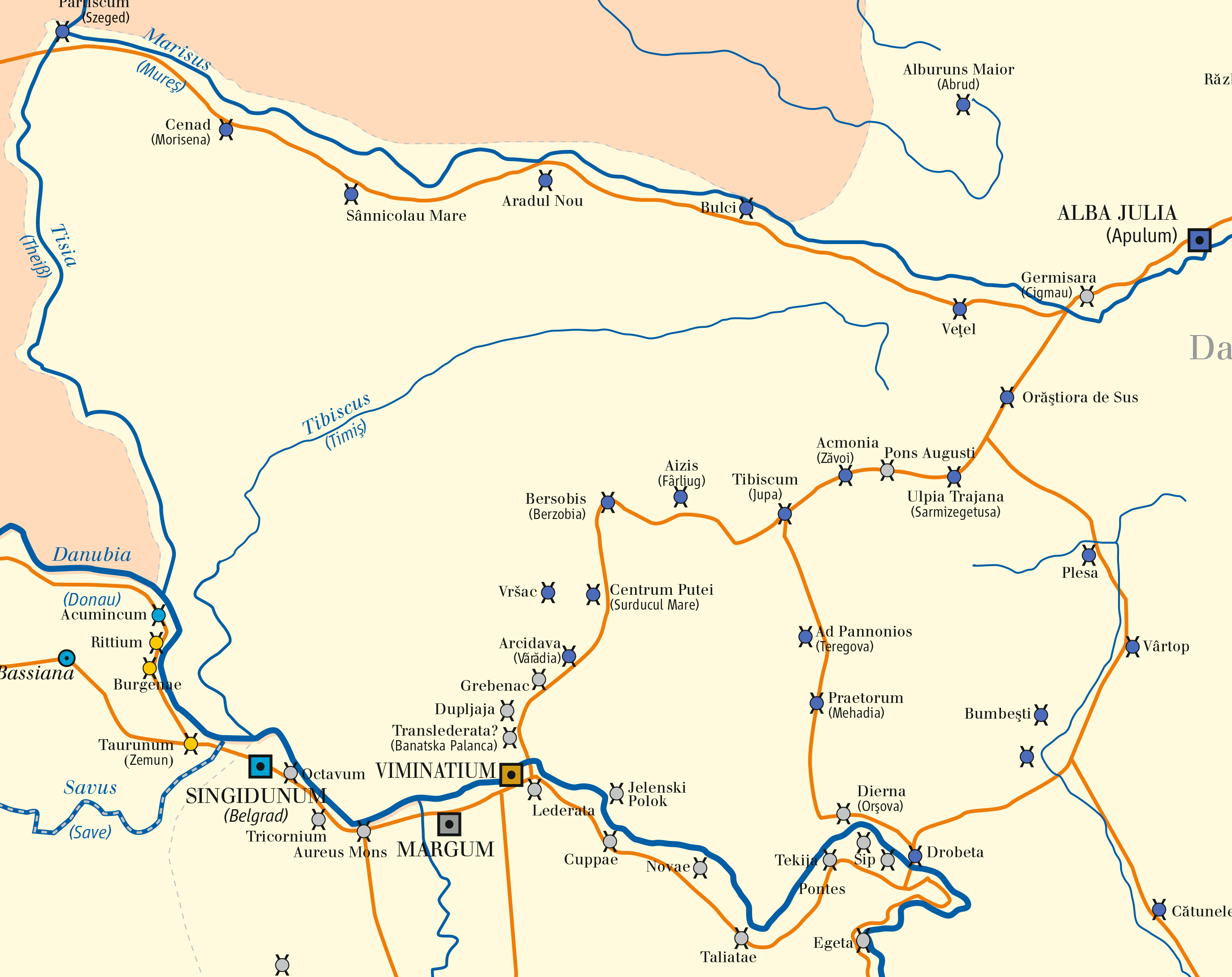
Western Dacia forts

== See also ==
- List of castra
