= Castra of Duleu =

Castra of Duleu may refer to:

- Castra of Duleu - Odăi, a fort in the Roman province of Dacia
- Castra of Duleu - Cornet cetate, a fort in the Roman province of Dacia

== See also ==
- List of castra
