= Cucuiș =

- Location within Romania

Location
- Country: Romania
- Counties: Hunedoara County
- Villages: Cucuiș, Căstău

Physical characteristics
- Mouth: Sibișel
  - location: Căstău
  - coordinates: 45.8241°N 23.2080°E
- Length: 13 km (8.1 mi)
- Basin size: 28 km^{2} (11 sq mi)

Basin features
- Progression: Sibișel→ Orăștie→ Mureș→ Tisza→ Danube→ Black Sea

The Cucuiș is a right tributary of the river Sibișel in Romania. It flows into the Sibișel near Căstău. Its length is 13 km (8.1 mi) and its basin size is 28 km^{2} (11 sq mi).
