= Bucsum =

Bucsum is the Hungarian name for three villages in Romania:

- Bucium village, Șinca Commune, Braşov County
- Bucium village, Orăştioara de Sus Commune, Hunedoara County
- Bucium-Orlea village, Sântămăria-Orlea Commune, Hunedoara County
