= Valea Mică =

Valea Mică ("little valley") may refer to the following places in Romania:

== Places ==
- Valea Mică, a village in the town of Zlatna, Alba County
- Valea Mică, a village in Roşiori Commune, Bacău County
- Valea Mică, a village in Cleja Commune, Bacău County
- Valea Mică, a village in Boroșneu Mare Commune, Covasna County
- Valea Mică, a village in Samarinești Commune, Gorj County
- Valea Mică, a village in Dumitrești Commune, Vrancea County

== Rivers ==
- Valea Mică, a tributary of the Ampoi in Alba County
- Valea Mică, a tributary of the Anineș in Hunedoara County
- Valea Mică, a tributary of the Dipșa in Bistrița-Năsăud County
- Valea Mică River (Mărtinia), a tributary of the Mărtinia River
- Valea Mică, a tributary of the Valea Mare in Hunedoara County
- Valea Mică, a tributary of the Valea Mare (Târnava Mică basin) in Alba County
- Uiloc River or Valea Mică River, a tributary of the Aita River
