= Ioan Sauca =

Romanian Orthodox priest

- Reverend
- Church: Romanian Orthodox Church
- Province: Orthodox Church
- Other post: Secretary general World Council of Churches from 2020 to 2023

Personal details
- Born: 10 April 1956 (age 70) Valea Mare, Caraș-Severin County, Romania
- Education: Lucian Blaga University of Sibiu; University of Bucharest; Bossey Ecumenical Institute; University of Birmingham

The Reverend Ioan Sauca (born 10 April 1956) was the acting general secretary of the World Council of Churches (WCC) from 2021 to 2023. He assumed the office on 1 April 2020 after Reverend Olav Fykse Tveit resigned on 31 March 2020. He was succeeded on January 1st, 2023, by the Reverend Jerry Pillay, he was previously the Deputy secretary general in 2020.

A senior priest from the Orthodox Church in Communist Romania, he was a professor of Ecumenical Theology in the Bossey Ecumenical Institute. He has been professor since 1998 and was the director of the Institute in 2001.

== Biography ==
Sauca was born in Valea Mare, Caraș-Severin County. After graduating in 1976 from the Theology Seminary in Caransebeș, he pursued his education at the Faculty of Theology of Sibiu (1981) and the Faculty of Orthodox Theology of the University of Bucharest (1981–1984). He attended the Graduate School at the Bossey Ecumenical Institute in 1984–1985 and went on to obtain his Ph.D. of Theology in 1987 from the University of Birmingham with a thesis on 'The Missionary Implications of Eastern Orthodox Ecclesiology'.

Sauca taught mission Ecumenical at the School of Theology in Sibiu. He later served as head of the Romanian Orthodox Church's Department of Press and Communication when it was newly established.

Sauca joined the World Council of Churches in 1994 as executive secretary for the Orthodox Studies and Relationship in Mission.

On 2 March 2022, Sauca wrote an open letter to Patriarch Kirill of Moscow, saying that he received numerous letters asking him to "approach Patriarch Kirill to mediate so that the war can be stopped and the suffering ended." Referring to the 2022 Russian invasion of Ukraine, Sauca continued, "Please, raise up your voice and speak on behalf of the suffering brothers and sisters, most of whom are also faithful members of our Orthodox Church."

== Publications ==
Sauca has many publication in five different languages. Some of his publications are:

- Orthodoxy and Cultures, probed the relationship of the Gospel to cultures (1996)
- Explored prospects for Building Bridges: Between the Orthodox and Evangelical Traditions (2012).
- The Church beyond our boundaries and the ecumenical vocation of Orthodoxy
- The authority to serve in a community of love: An orthodox perspective on authority in the Church
- Santiago de Compostela - Ein wichtiger Schritt auf dem Weg zu umfassender christlicher Koinonia; Growing together into full koinonia – Orthodox considerations
- The development of the Sacrament of Baptism and its practice during centuries
- Orthodox considerations on the ecumenical document BEM
- Eglise locale
- The meaning of the veneration of icons (in Romanian), 1977
- In: Mitropolia Banatului, an XXVII, nr. 4–6, aprilie-iunie 1977, pp. 56–62
- Missionary Challenges in Post-Communist contexts, 1997
- Eschatologie et societé aujourd’hui: questions et perspectives. Une approche orthodoxe, (2000)
- In: Irenikon, no.3-4, 2000, pp. 359–373 Eglise locale, 2001
- Spindler, Cerf, Labor et Fides, Clé, Paris/Geneva/Yaoundé, 2001.
- Vocatia ecumenica an Ortodoxiei, 2004
