= Dacian fortress of Cucuiș – Dealul Golu =

Dacian fortress of Cucuiș
- Location within Romania
- 45.7641°N 23.2655°E
- Location: Dealul Golu, Cucuiș, Hunedoara County, Romania

Site notes
- Condition: Ruined

Monument istoric
- Reference no.: HD-I-s-B-03185

It was a Dacian fortified town.
