= Dacian fortress of Cucuiș – Vârful Berianului =

Dacian fortress of Cucuiș - Vârful Berianului
- Location within Romania
- 45.751°N 23.303°E
- Location: Vârful Berianului, Cucuiș, Hunedoara, Romania

Site notes
- Elevation: 480 m (1,570 ft)
- Condition: Ruined

It was a Dacian fortified town.
