= Aizis =

Ancient Dacian town in Romania

- Aixis, Aixim, Airzis, Azizis, Azisis, Aizisis, Alzisis, Aigis, Aigizidava, Zizis
- Location within Romania
- 45.4877°N 21.8498°E
- Location: Caraș-Severin, Romania

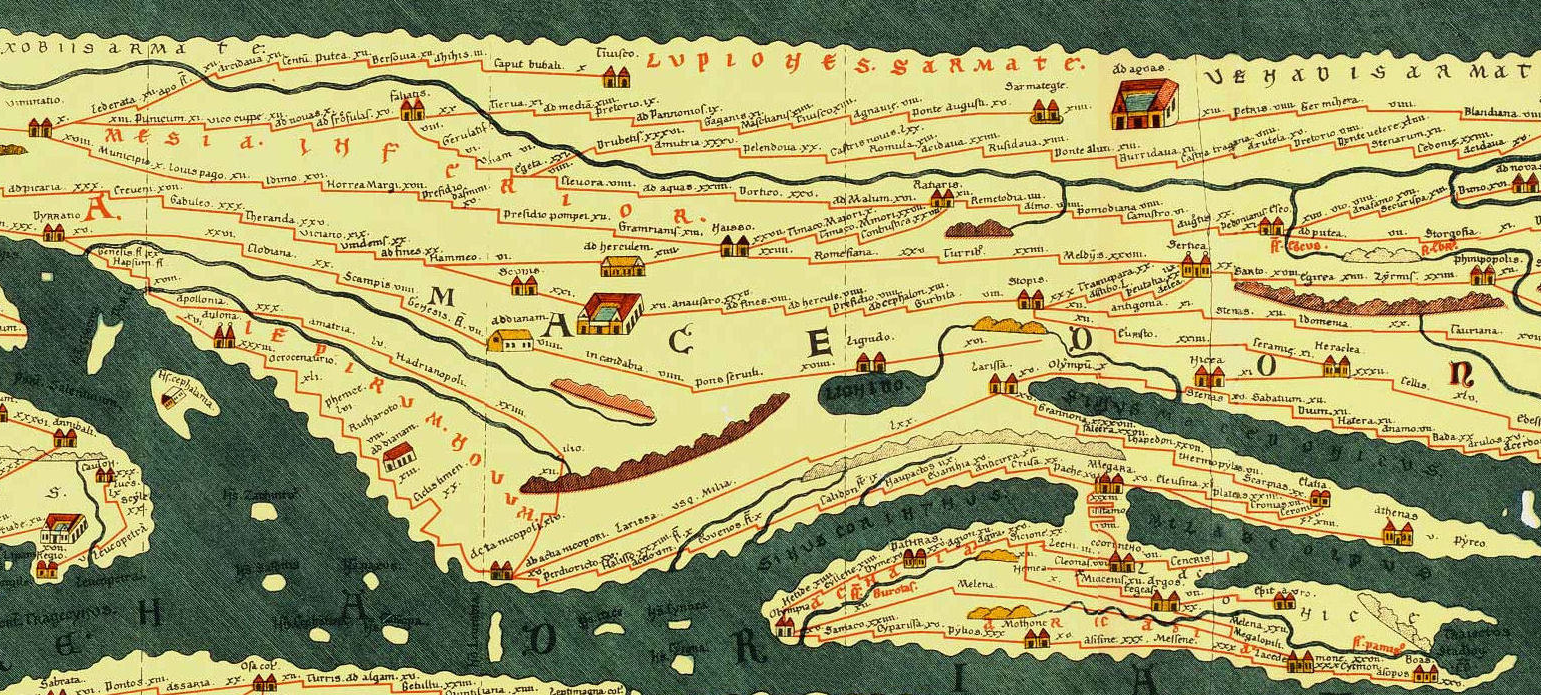
Aizis on the Roman Dacia selection from Tabula Peutingeriana (top upper left corner)

Aizis (Aixis, Aixim, Airzis, Azizis, Azisis, Aizisis, Alzisis, Aigis, Aigizidava[*], Zizis, Ancient Greek: Αίζισίς) was a Dacian town mentioned by Emperor Trajan in his work Dacica. Located at Dealul Ruieni, Fârliug, Caraș-Severin, Banat, Romania.

One sentence surviving from Dacica, in the Latin grammar work of Priscian, Institutiones grammaticae, says: inde Berzobim, deinde Aizi processimus, meaning We then advanced to Berzobim, next to Aizi. The phrase describes the initial itinerary march into Dacia by the Roman army. After the Roman conquest of Dacia, the Aizis fort was built there.

It is also depicted in the Tabula Peutingeriana, as Azizis, on a Roman road network, between Bersovia and Caput Bubali.

== Etymology ==
The place name Aizizi, located in the South West of Dacia has a root / radical containing the Bactrian "ait", Armenian "iz" 'snake' or better the Bactrian "azi" Armenian "ajts" 'goat'. The Romanian historian and archaeologist Vasile Pârvan also gives the meaning 'goat'.

This Dacian name (mentioned also by Ptolemy as Αίζισίς) confirms the Dacian language change from Proto-Indo-European *g to z: Αίζισίς (Ptolemy) < *aig-is(yo) – '(place) with goats' (Greek αίζ, αίγός goat)

== See also ==
- Roman Dacia
- Trajan
- Dacica
- List of ancient cities in Thrace and Dacia
