= Ostrovul Mare, Islaz =

Natural reserve in Teleorman County, Romania

Coordinates: 43°59′N 22°54′E

Ostrovul Mare is a natural reserve, an island on the Danube together with Ostrovul Calnovăț, in the proximity of Islaz, Teleorman County, Romania. On the island is a breeding a colony of pygmy cormorant.
