= Colnic mine =

Open-cast gold and copper mine near Deva, Romania

Colnic
- Location in Romania
- Location: Beriu, Hunedoara County, Romania; 45°28′N 23°07′E
- Production: approx 113,000
- Financial year: 2009
- Company: Euro Sun Mining
- Acquired: 2005

The Colnic mine is a large open pit mine in the west of Romania in Hunedoara County, 30 km north of Deva and 400 km north of the capital, Bucharest. Colnic represents a large gold and copper deposit with estimated reserves of 2.15 million oz of gold and 135,000 tonnes of copper. The project is owned by the Toronto-based company Euro Sun Mining.

The project will involve the mining and processing of 14.4 million tonnes of ore per annum over an open pit life of 19 years. The open pit is expected to yield approximately 113,000 oz of gold and 7,100 tonnes of copper per year in doré, reflecting an average total process recovery of 68% for gold and approximately 91% for copper.
