= Castra of Băneasa =

Fort in the Roman province of Dacia

- Location within Romania
- 43°56′29″N 24°58′07″E
- Location: Băneasa, Teleorman, Romania

History
- Founded: 2nd century AD
- Abandoned: 3rd century AD

Site notes
- Condition: Ruined

Castra of Băneasa was a fort in the Roman province of Dacia and part of the Roman frontier system of the Limes Transalutanus.

== See also ==
- List of castra
