= Sibișel (Orăștie) =

- Location within Romania

Location
- Country: Romania
- Counties: Hunedoara County
- Villages: Sibișel, Căstău, Orăștie

Physical characteristics
- Mouth: Orăștie
  - location: Orăștie
  - coordinates: 45.8461°N 23.2088°E
- Length: 28 km (17 mi)
- Basin size: 167 km^{2} (64 sq mi)

Basin features
- Progression: Orăștie→ Mureș→ Tisza→ Danube→ Black Sea
- Tributaries
  - left: Gliva, Raușor
  - right: Cucuiș

The Sibișel is a right tributary of the river Orăștie in Romania. It discharges into the Orăștie in the town Orăștie. Its length is 28 km (17 mi) and its basin size is 167 km^{2} (64 sq mi).
