= Dacica =

Latin work by Roman Emperor Trajan

Dacica (De bello dacico)
- Author: Trajan
- Language: Classical Latin
- Subject: History, military history
- Publication date: ? 100s AD

Dacica ("Dacian [matters]"), or De bello dacico ("On the Dacian War"), is a lost Latin work by Roman Emperor Trajan, written in the spirit of Julius Caesar's commentaries like De Bello Gallico, and describing Trajan's campaigns in Dacia.

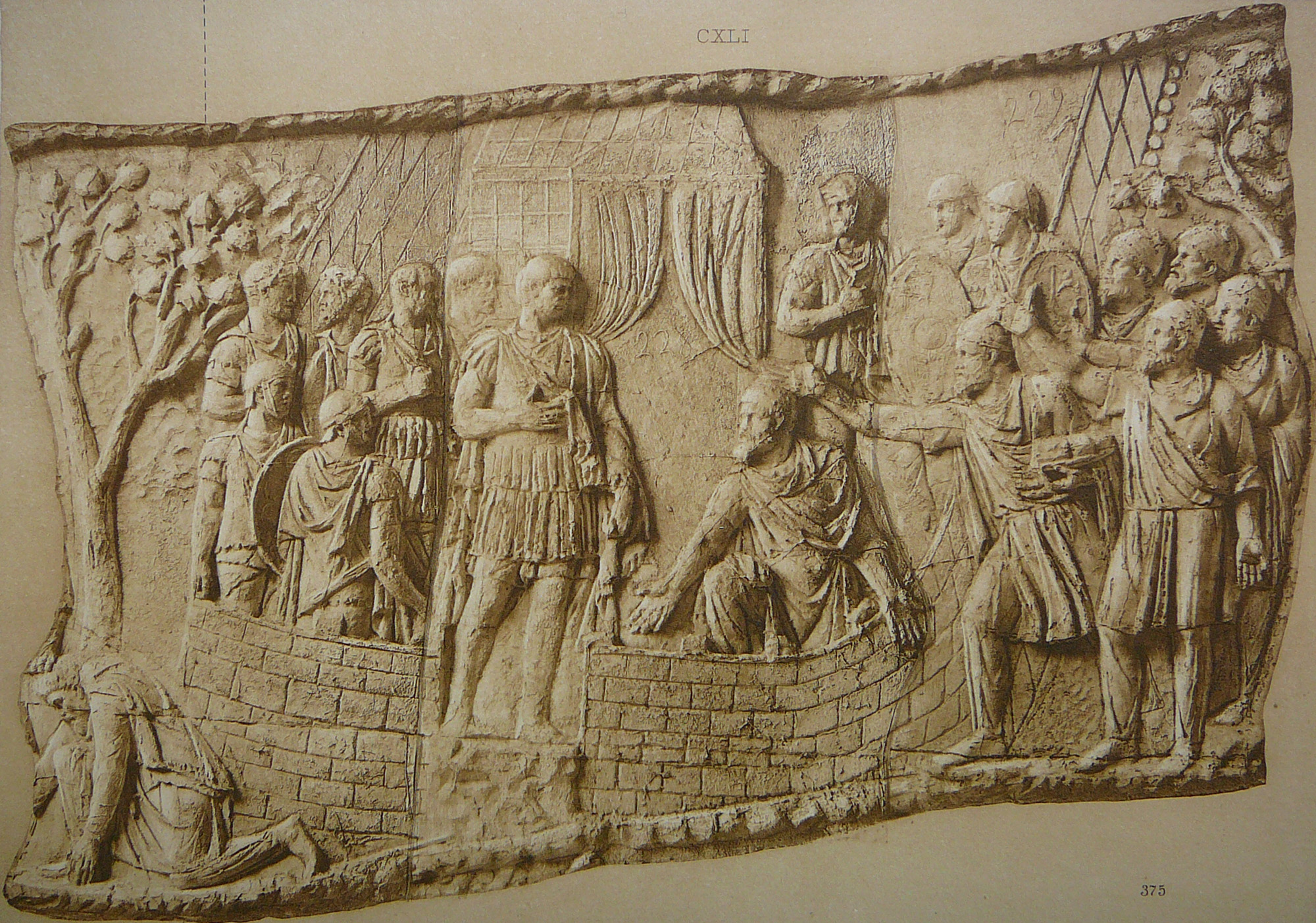
Dacian chieftains before Trajan (from Trajan's Column)

It is assumed to be based on Criton of Heraclea's Getica, a work on the history of the Daco-Getae. Criton was Trajan's Greek chief physician and procurator, during the Dacian wars.

Based on the research so far, Dacica is considered lost. However, one sentence survived in the Latin grammar work by Priscian. To describe a grammatical rule, Priscian cites Trajan: inde Berzobim, deinde Aizi processimus, meaning We then advanced to Berzobim, next to Aizi. The phrase describes the initial penetration into Dacia by the Roman army. It also mentions two Dacian towns where later Roman castra were built: Berzovia and Aizis.
