= Castra of Costești =

Fort in the Roman province of Dacia

- Location within Romania
- 45.6877492°N 23.2094925°E
- Location: Prisaca, Costești, Hunedoara, Romania

History
- Founded: unknown
- Abandoned: unknown

Site notes
- Elevation: 1,203 m (3,947 ft)
- Condition: Ruined

The castra of Costești was a fort in the Roman province of Dacia. Erected and abandoned by the Romans at an uncertain date, its ruins are located in Costești (commune Orăștioara de Sus, Romania) on a hilltop, at an altitude of 1203 meters.

Archeologist Aurora Peţan claims this fortification could be a Dacian hill fort because its shape is irregular, the ditch is inside fortification, only Dacian pottery was found during the excavations, and it is placed on a strategic defense location - common to Dacian fortresses.

== See also ==
- List of castra
