= Orăștie (river) =

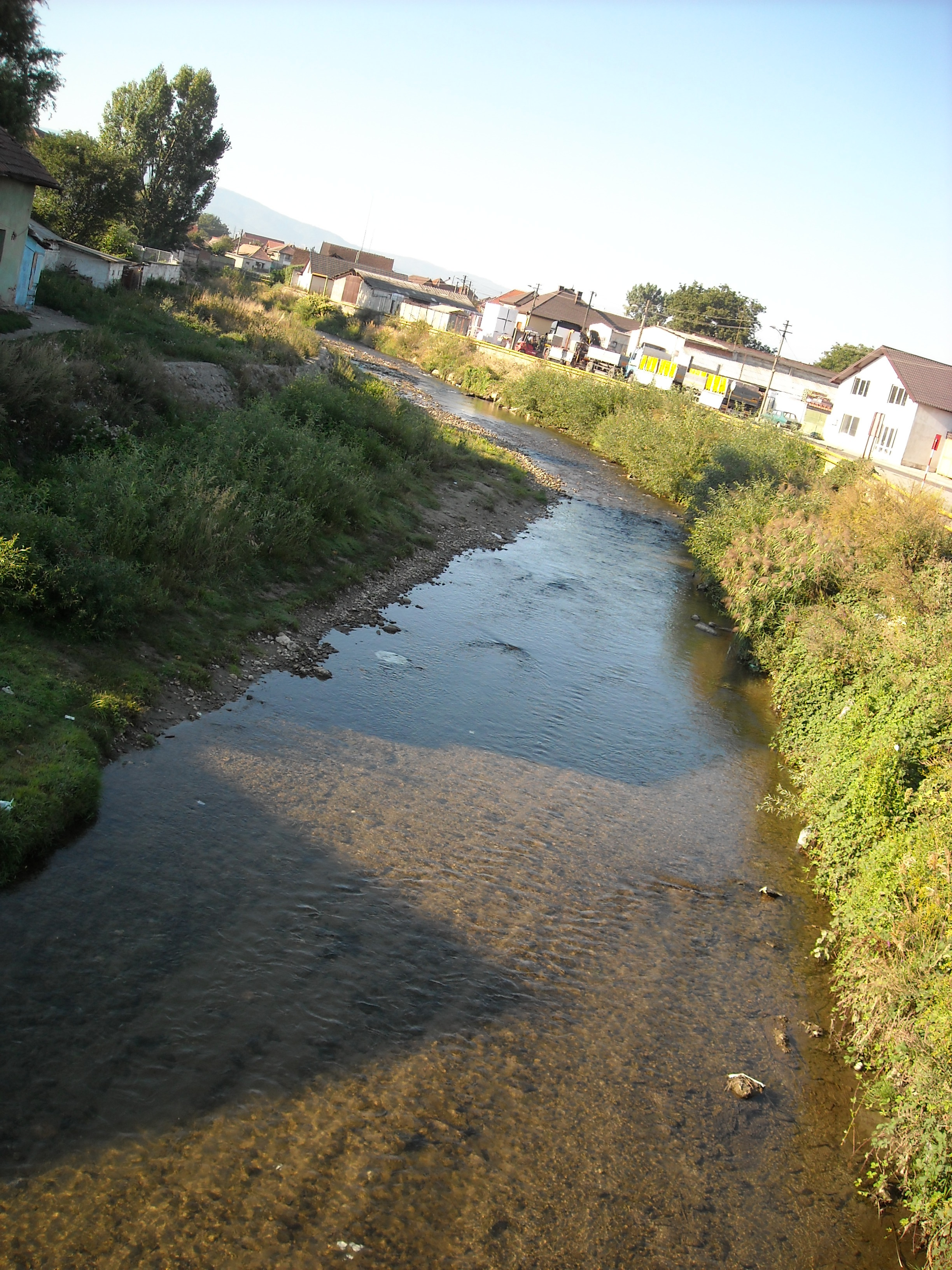
- Orăștie River

- Location within Romania

Location
- Country: Romania
- Counties: Hunedoara County
- Communes: Orăștioara de Sus, Beriu, Orăștie

Physical characteristics
- Source: Mount Zebru
  - location: Șureanu Mountains
  - coordinates: 45°39′36″N 23°23′11″E
  - elevation: 1,451 m (4,760 ft)
- Mouth: Mureș
  - location: near Orăștie
  - coordinates: 45°52′48″N 23°10′57″E
  - elevation: 195 m (640 ft)
- Length: 51 km (32 mi)
- Basin size: 399 km^{2} (154 sq mi)
- Discharge
  - location: Orăștie
  - average: 2.00 m^{3}/s (71 cu ft/s)

Basin features
- Progression: Mureș→ Tisza→ Danube→ Black Sea
- Tributaries
  - right: Sibișel

The Orăștie is a left tributary of the river Mureș in Romania. It discharges into the Mureș near the town Orăștie. Its length is 51 km (32 mi) and its basin size is 399 km^{2} (154 sq mi).

The upper reach of the river is also known as Godeanu. The middle reach is locally known as Grădiștea or Beriu. The lower reach, downstream of the confluence with the Sibișel is known as Apa Orașului (Hungarian: Városvíz, meaning "Townwater")

== Tributaries ==
The following rivers are tributaries to the river Orăștie (from source to mouth):

- Left: Șes, Valea lui Brad, Valea Largă, Pustiosu, Pietrosu, Feierag
- Right: Pârâul Alb, Anineș, Valea Rea, Valea Muții, Sibișel
