= Castra of Livezile =

Fort in the Roman province of Dacia

- Location within Romania
- 47.18687°N 24.57075°E
- Location: Poderei, Livezile, Bistrița-Năsăud, Romania

History
- Founded: 2nd century AD
- Abandoned: 3rd century AD

Site notes
- Archaeologists: Dumitru Protase
- Condition: Ruined

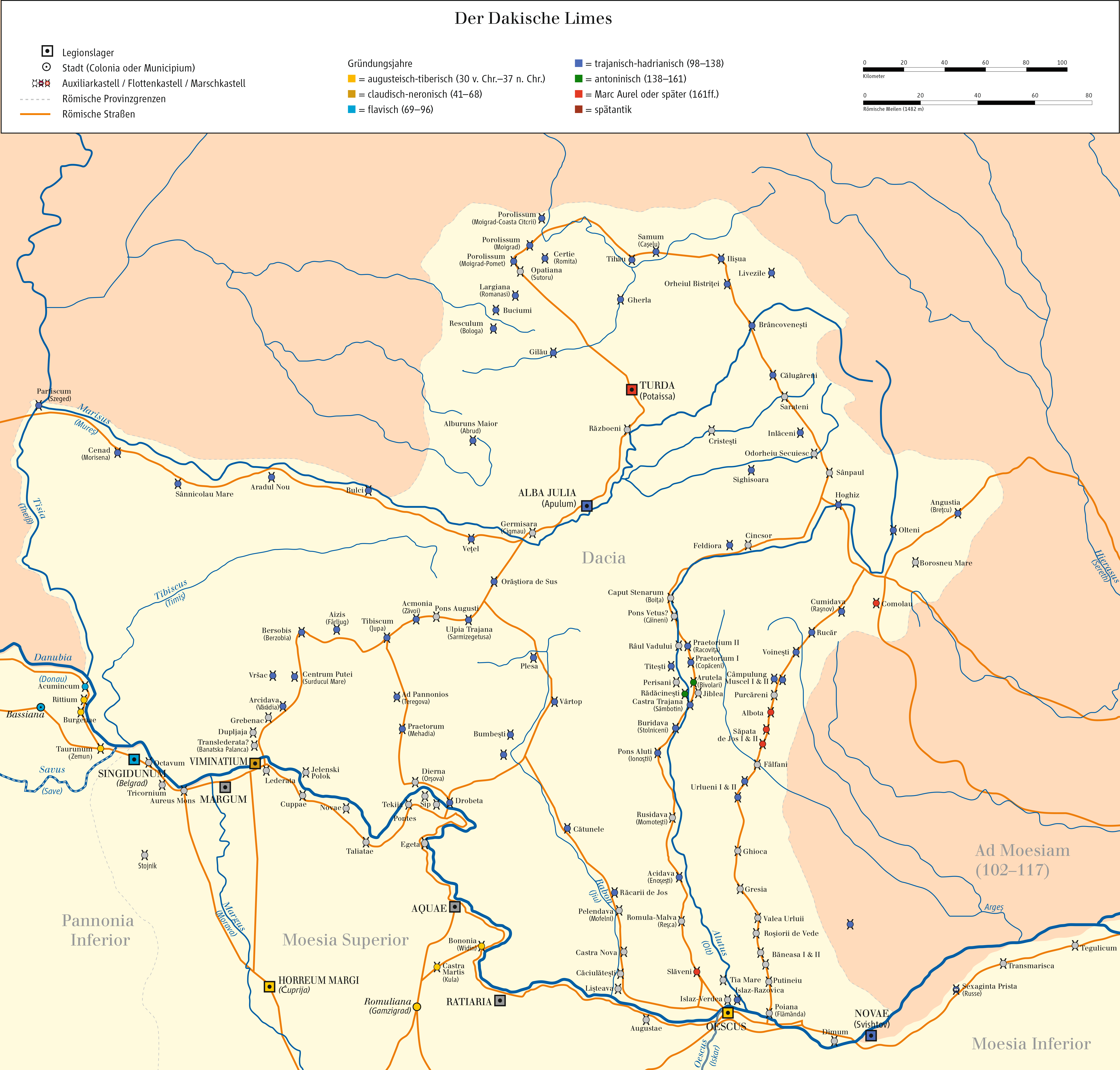
A historical map illustrating the Limes in the Roman province of Dacia

The castra of Livezile was a castra in the Roman province of Dacia, located in the north side of the modern commune of Livezile in the historical region of Transylvania, Romania. The fort was erected and surrounded by a ditch in the 2nd century AD. The castra was abandoned in the 3rd century and its ruins are still visible.

== See also ==
- List of castra
- List of castra in Romania
