= Castra of Cioroiu Nou =

Fort in the Roman province of Dacia

- Location within Romania
- 44.0575°N 23.439167°E
- Location: Cioroiu Nou, Dolj, Romania

History
- Founded: 2nd century AD
- Abandoned: 2nd or 3rd century AD

Site notes
- Archaeologists: Dorel Bondoc
- Condition: Ruined

The castra of Cioroiu Nou was a fort in the Roman province of Dacia. It was erected in the 2nd century AD. Consisting of two ramparts forming a letter "V", the defensive system of the Roman settlement at Cioroiu Nou was complex. The Romans abandoned the fort in the 2nd or in the 3rd century. Its ruins are located in Cioroiu Nou, commune Cioroiași, Romania.

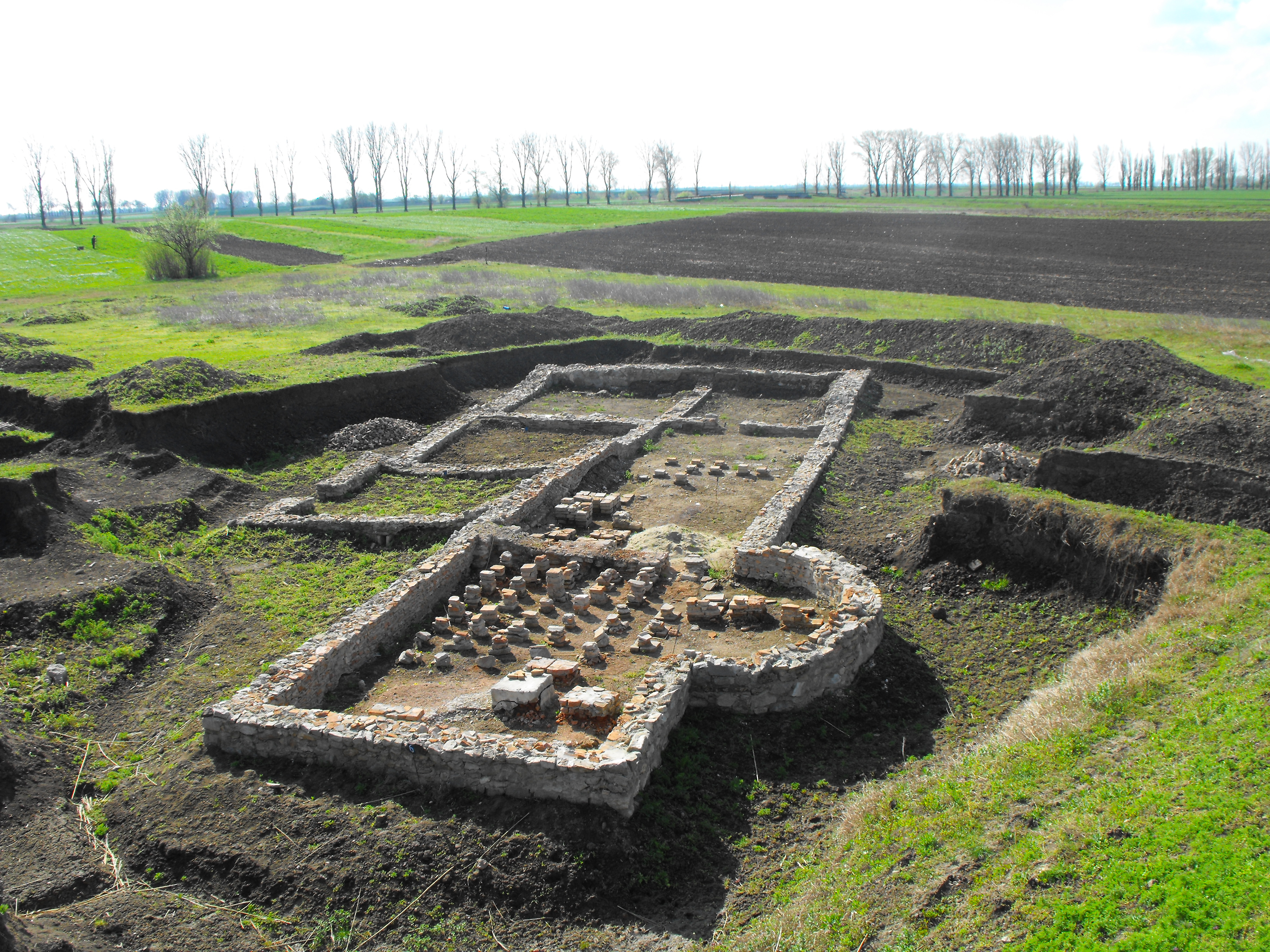
Baths

== See also ==
- List of castra
