= Anineș =

- Location within Romania

Location
- Country: Romania
- Counties: Hunedoara County
- Villages: Grădiștea de Munte

Physical characteristics
- Source: Mount Ceata
  - location: Șureanu Mountains
  - coordinates: 45°40′42″N 23°14′06″E
  - elevation: 1,241 m (4,072 ft)
- Mouth: Orăștie
  - location: Grădiștea de Munte
  - coordinates: 45°37′56″N 23°12′52″E
  - elevation: 527 m (1,729 ft)
- Length: 11 km (6.8 mi)
- Basin size: 26 km^{2} (10 sq mi)

Basin features
- Progression: Orăștie→ Mureș→ Tisza→ Danube→ Black Sea
- Tributaries
  - left: Gârbava
  - right: Valea Mică

The Anineș is a right tributary of the river Orăștie in Transylvania, Romania. It discharges into the Orăștie near Grădiștea de Munte. Its length is 11 km (6.8 mi) and its basin size is 26 km^{2} (10 sq mi).
