= Criton of Heraclea =

2nd century Greek physician and historian to Emperor Trajan

Criton of Heraclea (Greek: Κρίτων, Latin: Titus Statilius Crito) was a 2nd-century (c. 100 AD) Greek chief physician and procurator of Roman Emperor Trajan (98–117) in the campaign in Dacia. He is perhaps the Criton mentioned in Martial's Epigrams.

He wrote a work on Cosmetics in four books, which were very popular in Galen's time and which contained almost all that had been written on the same subject by Heraclides of Tarentum, Cleopatra, and others. The contents of each chapter of the four books have been preserved by Galen, who frequently quotes from it. Criton wrote also a work on Simple Medicines of which the fourth book is quoted by Galen; he is also quoted by Aëtius and Paul of Aegina, and may perhaps be the person to whom one of the letters of Apollonius of Tyana is addressed.

Criton also has a historical work, Getica, now lost about the history of Daco-Getae. Getica was at the basis of Trajan's own work, Dacica (or De bello dacico), about his Dacian Wars, which is also lost. He is perhaps the author of a work on Cookery, mentioned by Athenaeus. None of his works seem to be extant, except a few fragments preserved by other authors.

As Trajan's medic, Criton created a mixture consumed daily by the emperor.

== Titles of works ==
- Cosmetics, a medical treatise
- Simple Medicines
- Getica, a work on the history of the Getae
