= Dacian fortress of Bucium =

Fortified town

- Location within Romania
- 45.733°N 23.189°E
- Location: Cărpeniş, Bucium, Hunedoara, Romania

Site notes
- Condition: Ruined

Monument istoric
- Reference no.: HD-I-s-A-03166

Dacian fortress of Bucium was a Dacian fortified town.

== See also ==
- Castra of Bucium
