= Castra of Târgșoru Vechi =

Fort in the Roman province of Dacia

- Location within Romania
- 44°53′N 25°55′E
- Location: Turnu Monastery, Târgșoru Vechi, Prahova, Romania

History
- Founded: 2nd century AD

Site notes
- Condition: Ruined

It was a fort in the Roman province of Dacia.

== See also ==
- List of castra
