= Romanian Orthodox Church in Communist Romania =

Church organization existed from 1947 - 1989

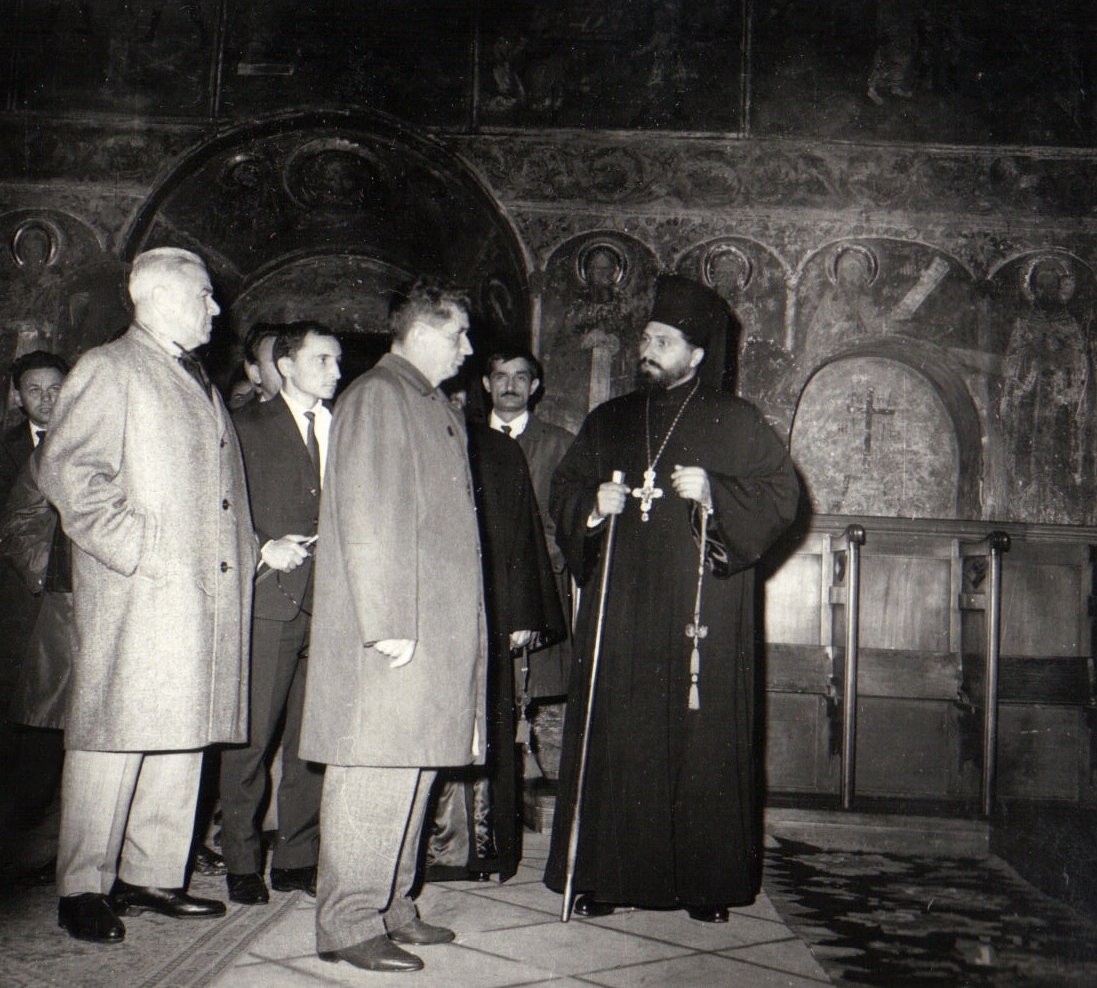
Nicolae Ceaușescu and other Party officials visit Neamț Monastery in 1966.

The Romanian Orthodox Church operated within Communist Romania between 1947 and 1989, the era during which Romania was a socialist state. The regime's relationship with the Orthodox Church was ambiguous during this period: while the government declared itself "atheist", it actively collaborated with the Church, and, during the Nicolae Ceaușescu era, the government used the Orthodox Church as part of his promotion of national identity (see National Communism in Romania).

Marxism–Leninism argued that religion was an instrument of exploitation and as such, it was to be desired to be discouraged, hence the anti-religious campaigns in the USSR. In Romania, under Patriarch Justinian, the Orthodox Church adjusted itself to support the new Communist government's "social justice" goals. The Orthodox Church did not protest or even acknowledge the existence of hundreds of thousands of Romanians in prisons and labour camps, some of whom were sentenced for religious reasons.

In exchange for the support of the regime, the Romanian government disbanded the Romanian Church United with Rome, Greek-Catholic and forcefully integrated its believers, churches and cathedrals into the Orthodox Church. Despite the compliance with the government, the Church also underwent a purge when the Soviet troops retreated from Romania. The government began a crackdown of possible dissidence among the religious people: between 1958 and 1963, about 2500 priests, monks and nuns were arrested, with a tacit approval by the Orthodox Church hierarchy.

During the Ceaușescu era, the priests of the Orthodox Church not only complied with the requests of the government, but they also showed sycophancy. Many priests collaborated with the secret police, the Securitate, giving it information they received from confessions; according to the reports of a Securitate officer, as many as 80% of the priests were informers.

== Collaboration with the government ==
The church collaborated closely with the Communist authorities in exchange with allowing it to keep its properties and a privileged position among the religious organizations. Furthermore, the Church was vulnerable to blackmail because many Orthodox priests were members of the fascist organization Iron Guard.

=== Takeover of the Greek Catholic Church ===
The Romanian Church United with Rome, Greek-Catholic (having 1.5 million believers and 1725 churches) shared the rituals with the Romanian Orthodox Church, but its hierarchy's links with the West led to a brutal suppression by the government, in collaboration with the Orthodox Church. The Greek-Catholic Church was officially called "anti-national and anti-historical" in official propaganda, being considered a way of splitting the Romanian nation.

The existence of the Greek Catholic church organization was ended on December 1, 1948; the Orthodox Church received all the properties of the Greek-Catholic Church, including churches and cathedrals. The clergy was forced, with the help of the Securitate, to accept the new Orthodox Church: 430 Greek Catholic priests out of 1800 signed a form approving the suppression of their church and incorporation in the Orthodox Church. The Orthodox congregations grew by hundreds of thousands of Greek Catholics who had been denied having their own places of worship.

=== Justinian Marina: the "Red Patriarch" ===
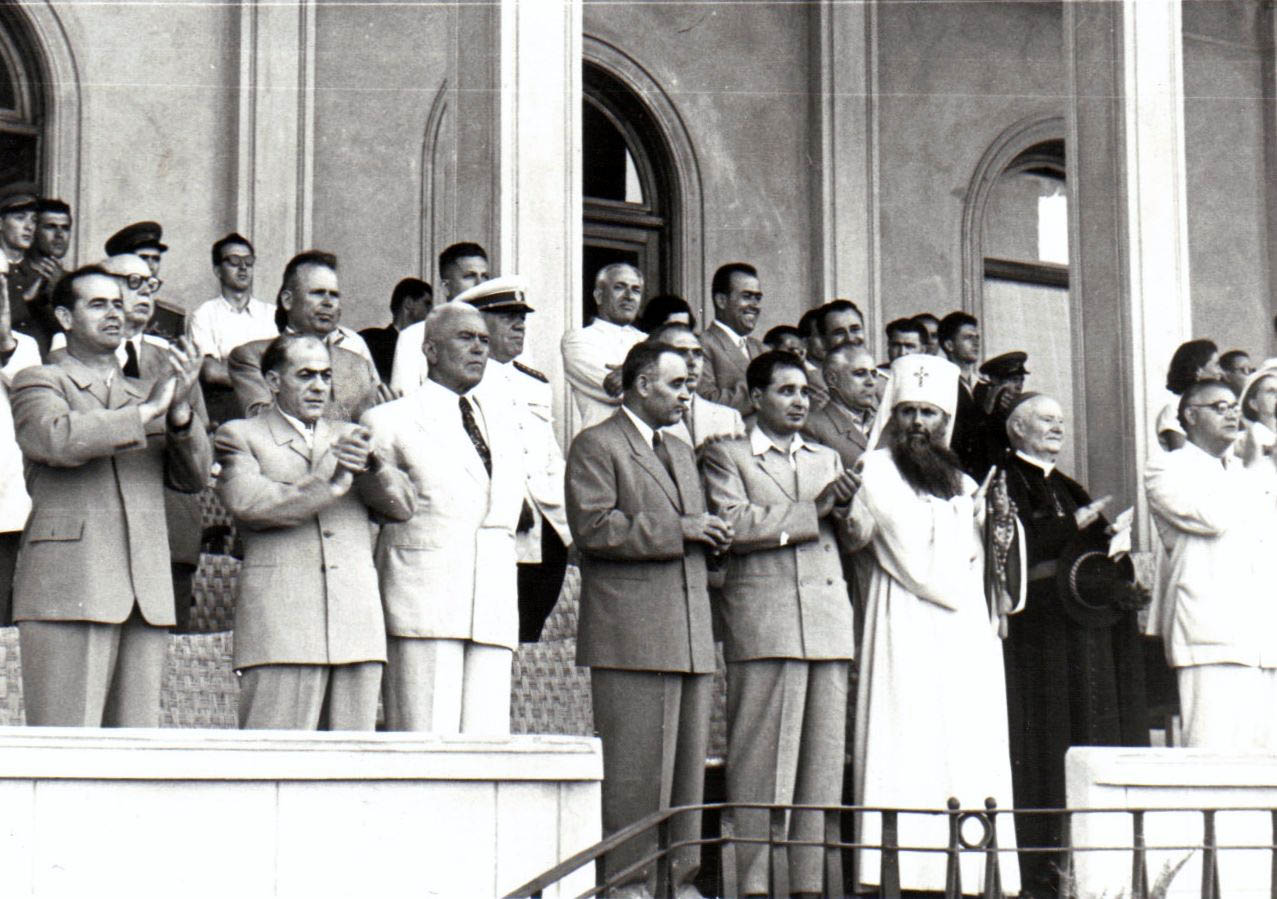
Patriarch Justinian with the Communist Party leadership at the World Youth Festival, 1953

Justinian Marina was the Patriarch of Romania starting with 1948, about the time that the Communist Party consolidated its power in Romania. He attempted to reconcile the Orthodox Church with the communist dialectical materialism, arguing that in the communist social order can be seen the principles of the Gospels, giving the church goals that were in sync with the Communist government. His collected work was published under the name Apostolat Social, in which he argued that socialism is an integral part of Christianity. The church assisted the government-led Romanian literacy campaign, reformed the monasteries so that the monks and nuns learn a "useful trade", encouraged the clergy to do social work.

None of Justinian's pronouncements mentioned the hundreds of thousands that were imprisoned for political reasons. For this reason, together with the close collaboration with the government, many believers, particularly Greek Catholics, saw him as "Communist stooge" and "an opportunist".

The Church's policies followed closely the ones of the government, even in external politics: initially, Romanian theologians condemned the World Council of Churches and the Roman Catholic Church as the instruments of "Anglo-American imperialism". By the 1960s, as Romania began developing contacts beyond the Eastern bloc, the church entered the ecumenical movement.

=== Orthodox Church and Nationalism ===
The Orthodox Church had previously supported nationalist positions before WWII, when Orthodoxy was linked to Fascist politics and antisemitism, as many priests had joined the fascist Iron Guard movement. A popular Orthodox author was theologian Nichifor Crainic advocated in his magazine Gândirea a nationalist and Orthodox ideology. Philosopher Nae Ionescu argued that being Romanian means being Orthodox and a similar position was advocated by the most important Romanian theologian of the 20th century, Dumitru Stăniloae.

Initially, after the Soviet occupation of Romania, the Romanian government supported proletarian internationalism and denounced nationalism, but, under Gheorghe Gheorghiu-Dej, as Romania became more independent, the government began building a national myth.

The Orthodox Church brought its contribution to the national myth-building through Mircea Păcurariu's official history textbooks, used in its seminaries, which argued that ancient Daco-Romans were Christianized by Saint Andrew, the disciple of Jesus.

=== Moisescu and Teoctist ===
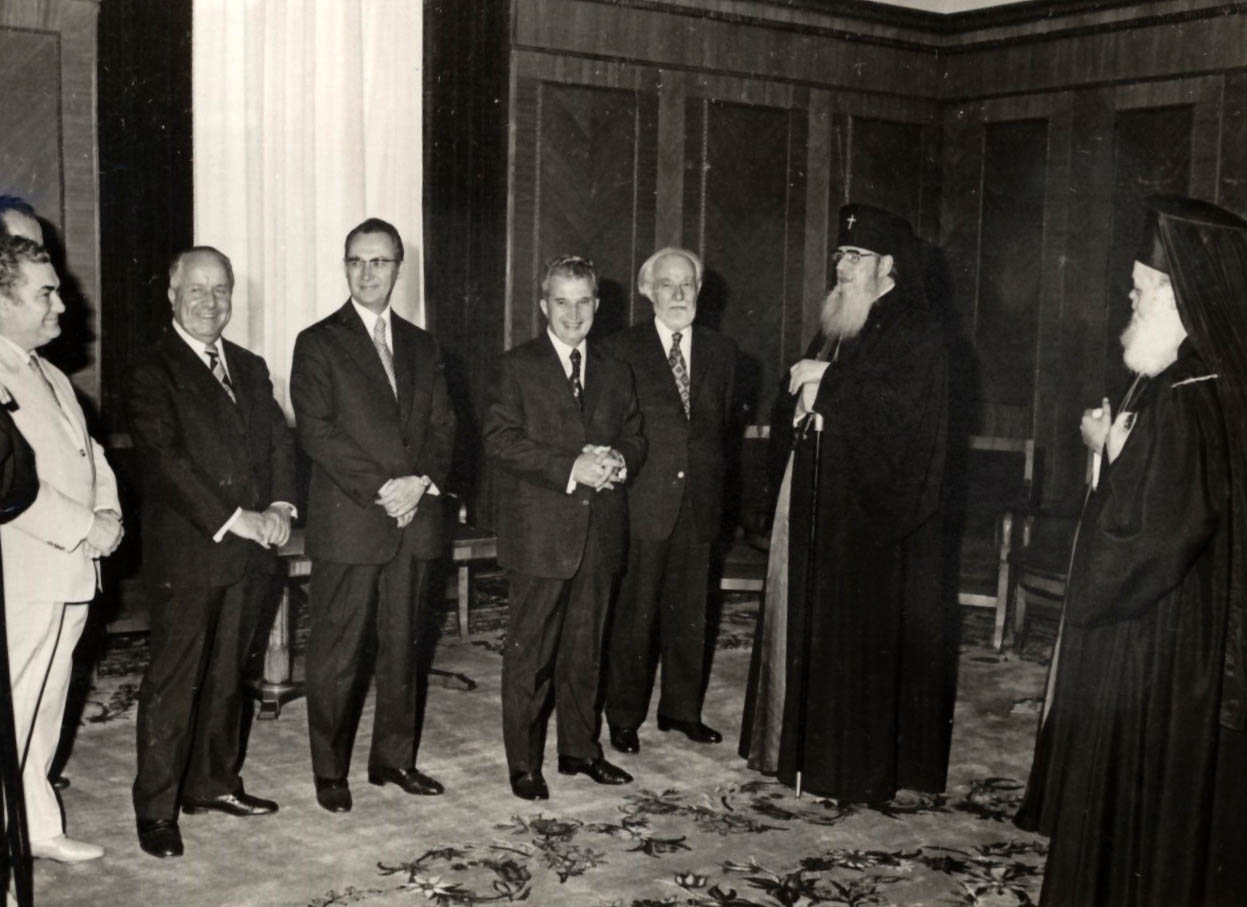
In 1977, Ceaușescu meets Justin Moisescu, the newly elected Patriarch of the Orthodox Church of Romania

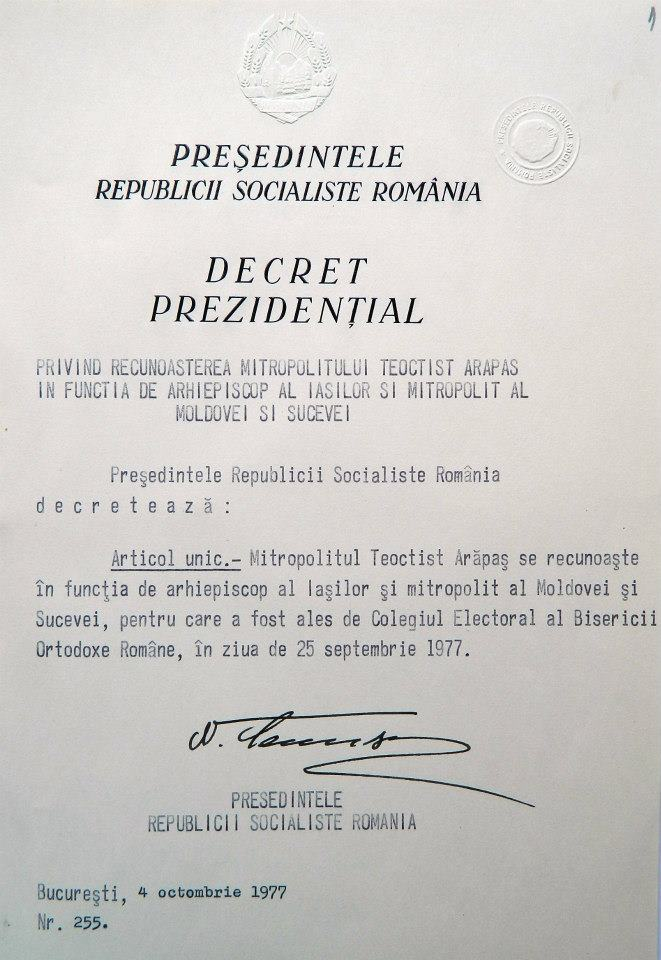
1977 presidential decree signed by Nicolae Ceaușescu recognizing Teoctist Arăpașu as Metropolitan of Moldavia

Teoctist Arăpașu became patriarch because of the support of the third patriarch, Justinian Marina. The communist government did not oppose him, as he was known to be obedient and accept compromises. He became known for his acceptance of Ceaușescu's policies, including demolitions of churches in "systematized" areas and defrocking any priests who stood up the government. His lack of reaction in the demolitions of 22 churches in Bucharest was widely seen as a sign of collaboration with the regime. Teoctist's public interventions included laudatory telegrams and speeches about Ceaușescu's achievements.

=== During and after 1989 Revolution ===
Even after the protest of Timișoara began, on December 19, 1989, Teoctist sent a telegram to Ceaușescu, congratulating him on his re-election as General Secretary of the Communist Party and praising him for his "brilliant activity", "wise guidance" and "daring thinking", hailing the "golden age" bearing Ceaușescu's name.

As the riots spread to Bucharest and Ceaușescu fled, Teoctist encouraged the believers to support the National Salvation Front (the organization that took power during the revolution) and he called Ceaușescu "a Herod of our times".

On January 18, 1990, Teoctist asked the believers and God to forgive him for "lying under duress" and for failing to oppose Ceaușescu's dictatorship. He resigned, citing his "health and age", the Synod accepting his resignation. Three months later, however, he returned to the Patriarchal Palace, to continue his rule as Patriarch. Teoctist claimed that the telegrams were just a ritual that was imposed by the party and they did not reflect his beliefs.

== Collaboration with the Securitate ==
While it is known that many priests collaborated with Securitate, the secret police, the extent of this collaboration is hard to assess. Unlike in other former communist countries, the Romanian government granted only limited access to the secret police files.

Some Orthodox priests gave the information they obtained from confessions to the political police. Officially, the Orthodox Church denied such a thing, but this only increased public mistrust. A number of priests admitted their collaboration: Nicolae Corneanu, Metropolitan of Banat, admitted that he collaborated with the Securitate and that he defrocked five dissident priests (including Gheorghe Calciu-Dumitreasa) in order to be allowed to rise in the church hierarchy.

The number of Securitate agents and informers has been estimated to be between 400,000 and 1 million, at a population of 23 million. There is no reliable data on profession of the informers, so the percentage of priests who collaborated with the Securitate is hard to estimate. Nevertheless, according to a priest from Galați County, in the whole county, only one or two priests refused to collaborate, and, according to the account of Roland Vasilievici, a Securitate officer in Timișoara who was in charge with recruiting priests, 80% to 90% of the priests were collaborators.

According to the same Securitate officer, the network of priests was subject to complex programs, which educated them into a nationalist and xenophobic spirit. The priests were sent in missions abroad, for collecting information and infiltration, as well as in propaganda machine of the government. Furthermore, he claims that all priests who were sent by the government to Western parishes were Securitate informants, who wrote reports on their return.

== Dissidence within the Orthodox Church ==
The Orthodox Church organization collaborated closely with the authorities, defrocking and firing any priests who opposed the government's policies. There were relatively few Orthodox priests who openly opposed the government, unlike other Christian denominations, such as Protestants, who defied the government.

A notable case is the one of priest Gheorghe Calciu-Dumitreasa, who, after preaching in Bucharest against atheism and authoritarianism, was fired from his teaching job at the Orthodox Seminary and later, in 1979, was sentenced to 10 years in prison for "the propagation of Fascist ideology". He was released in 1985 after international pressure and following a forced residence in a village in southern Romania, he was pressured to leave Romania.

The demolition of Bucharest churches saw no protest from the Orthodox Church hierarchy, but there was another singular case of dissent, this time from abroad. In 1987, Ion Dura, a priest sent by the Orthodox Church to serve the Romanian community in Benelux, wrote an open letter to World Council of Churches condemning the demolition of the churches and arguing that even the demolition of the Patriarchal Palace was planned. However, no other priest, not even among those serving abroad, voiced his dissent against the systematization policies of Ceaușescu.

== Monasticism in Communist Romania ==
Patriarch Justinian began reforming the 200 monasteries in Romania, so that monks and nuns would learn trades. Some monasteries even organized as agricultural cooperatives, workshops and other rural arts. This development led to an increase in the number of monks and nuns, so that by 1956, the number increased by 7000.

In 1958, as the Soviet troops withdrew from Romania, the Party identified the monasteries as one possible point of opposition to the government, and it began to note any sign of dissidence in the monasteries. Between 1958 and 1963, 2,500 priests, monks, nuns and lay people were arrested and half of the monasteries were shut down. In 1959, the Holy Synod accepted the government's restrictions on monasticism, including the closing of the three monastic seminaries. Further restrictions were put in place in 1966, when nuns under the age of 40 and monks under the age of 55 were required to leave the monasteries and do "socially useful work".

For the rest of Ceaușescu's rule, monasticism was discouraged, but not suppressed.

== Legacy ==
After 1989, the Orthodox Church tried to explain their behaviour during the Communist-ruled era. Patriarch Teoctist said that they were not collaborators, but rather they were trying to defend what was left of religion in Romania. In a contradictory statement, Teoctist argued that they were not alone in collaboration with the Communist authorities and that every Romanian adult collaborated, one way or the other, with them.

Bishop Nifon Ploieșteanul argued that in this case, the end justifies the means and that the goal was to give the Church material welfare and a relative prosperity and this justified the hierarchs' support of the authorities, the lack of criticism over injustices or defend those persecuted by the government.
