= Media (castra) =

- Castra of Mediaș
- Location within Romania
- 46°09′N 24°21′E
- Location: Historical city center, Mediaș, Sibiu, Romania

History
- Founded: 2nd century AD

Site notes
- Condition: Ruined

Media was a fort in the Roman province of Dacia.

== See also ==
- List of castra
