= Salcia, Teleorman =

Salcia
- Commune
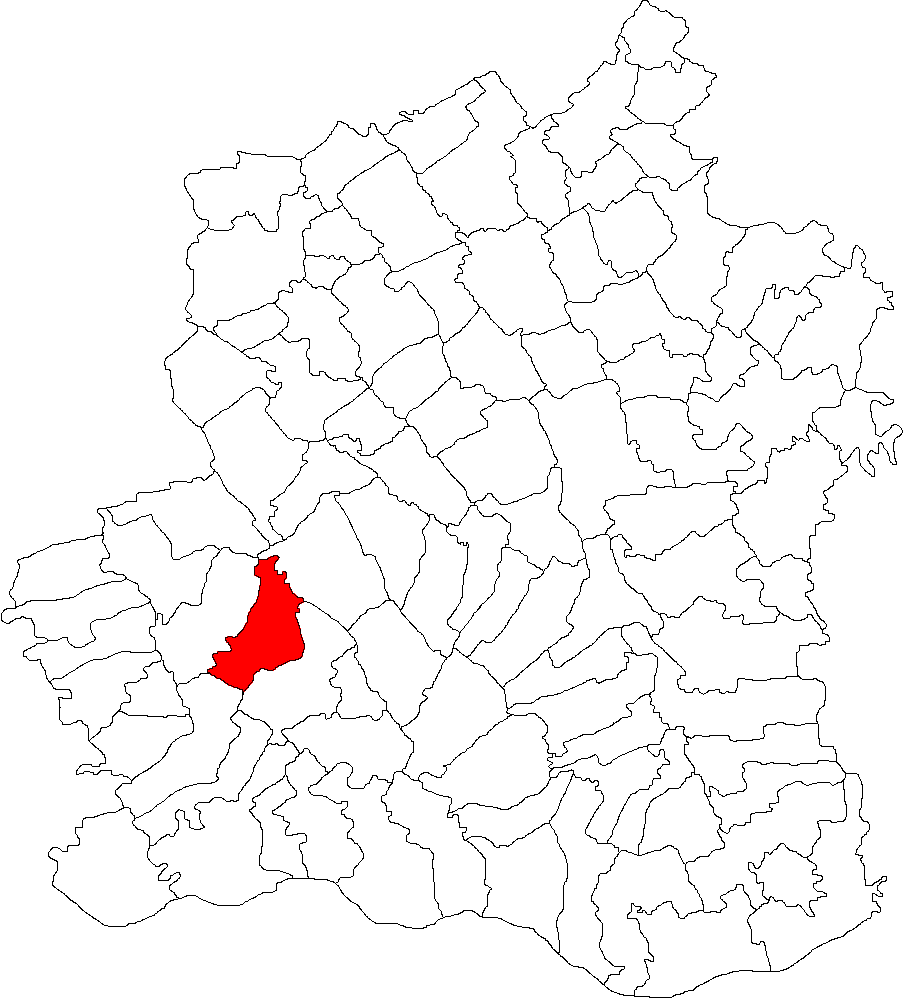
- Location in Teleorman County

- Location in Romania
- Coordinates: 43°57′N 24°55′E
- Country: Romania
- County: Teleorman
- Subdivisions: Băneasa, Salcia, Tudor Vladimirescu

Government
  - Mayor (2020–2024): Marius Șună (PSD)
- Area: 60 km^{2} (20 sq mi)
- Elevation: 64 m (210 ft)
- Population (2021-12-01): 2,010
  - Density: 34/km^{2} (87/sq mi)
- Time zone: EET/EEST (UTC+2/+3)
- Postal code: 147300
- Area code: +(40) 247
- Vehicle reg.: TR

Salcia is a commune in Teleorman County, Muntenia, Romania. It is composed of three villages: Băneasa, Salcia, and Tudor Vladimirescu.

== Natives ==
- Zaharia Stancu (1902–1974), prose writer, novelist, poet, and philosopher
