= Beriu =

- Commune
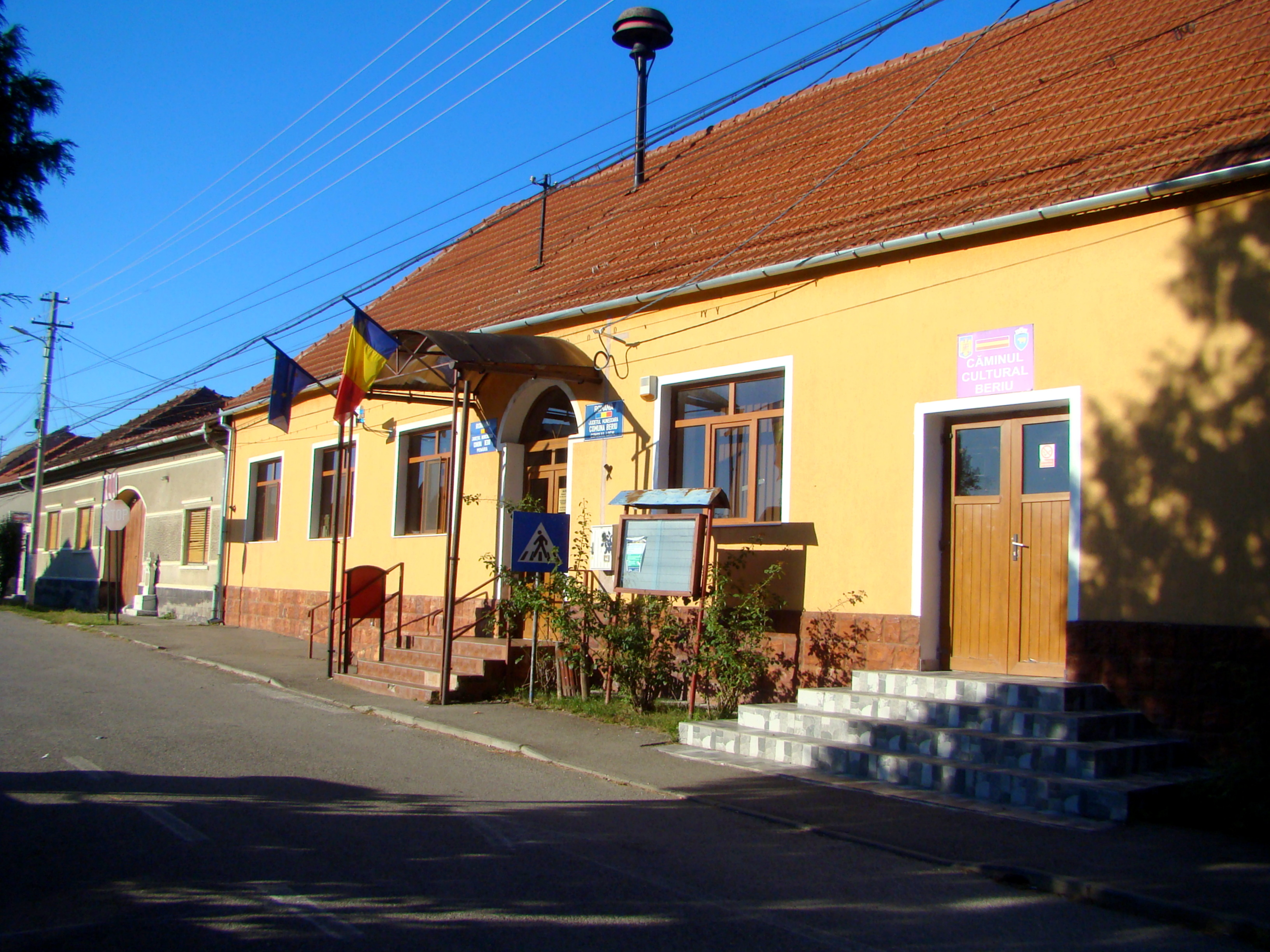
- Beriu town hall and community center

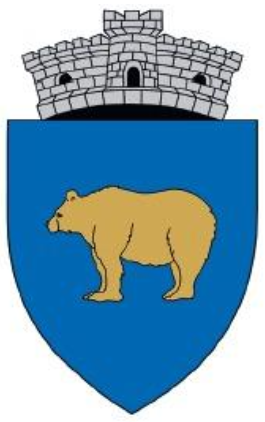
- Coat of arms

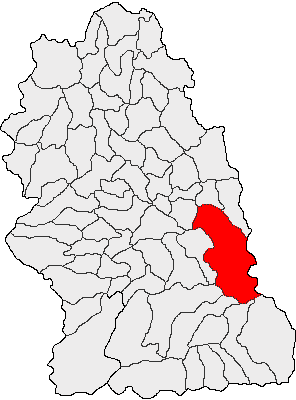
- Location in Hunedoara County

- Location in Romania
- Coordinates: 45°47′N 23°11′E
- Country: Romania
- County: Hunedoara

Government
  - Mayor (2024–2028): Emil Moise Bîc (PNL)
- Area: 184.79 km^{2} (71.35 sq mi)
- Elevation: 269 m (883 ft)
- Population (2021-12-01): 3,281
  - Density: 17.76/km^{2} (45.99/sq mi)
- Time zone: UTC+02:00 (EET)
  - Summer (DST): UTC+03:00 (EEST)
- Postal code: 337075
- Area code: (+40) 02 54
- Vehicle reg.: HD
- Website: www.primariaberiu.ro

Beriu (Hungarian: Berény, German: Bärendorf) is a commune in Hunedoara County, Transylvania, Romania. It is composed of eight villages: Beriu, Căstău (Kasztó), Cucuiș (Kukuis), Măgureni (Magureny), Orăștioara de Jos (Alsóvárosvíz), Poieni (Pojénytanya), Sereca (Szereka), and Sibișel (Ósebeshely).

The commune is located in the western part of Hunedoara County, 7 km (4.3 mi) south of Orăștie and 31 km (19 mi) southeast of the county seat, Deva, on the border with Alba County. It is situated at the southwestern edge of the Transylvanian Plateau, north of the Șureanu Mountains, at the western end of the historic Seven Seats region. It lies on the banks of the river Orăștie and its tributary, the Sibișel, with its own tributary, the Cucuiș.

In Cucuiș village there are two Dacian fortresses, at Dealul Golu and Vârful Berianului. The Colnic mine is a large open pit gold and copper mine situated on the territory of the commune.

Historical population
Year	Pop.	±%
1850	4,281	—
2002	3,354	−21.7%
2011	3,138	−6.4%
2021	3,281	+4.6%
Source: Census data

At the 2021 census, the commune had a population of 3,281, of which 91.04% were Romanians.
