= Castra of Tileagd =

Fort in the Roman province of Dacia

- Location within Romania
- 47°04′N 22°12′E
- Location: Tileagd, Bihor, Romania

History
- Founded: 2nd century AD

Site notes
- Condition: Ruined

The Castra of Tileagd was a fort in the Roman province of Dacia.

== See also ==
- List of castra
