= Castra of Pinoasa =

Fort in the Roman province of Dacia

- Location within Romania
- 44.9310°N 23.1287°E
- Location: Pinoasa, Gorj, Romania

History
- Founded: 2nd century AD
- Abandoned: unknown

Site notes
- Excavation dates: 1976
- Archaeologists: Pamfil Polonic; C. C. Petolescu
- Condition: Disappeared

The castra of Pinoasa was a fort in the Roman province of Dacia. Matei Dan dates the castra to the period of the Dacian Wars. Its ruins were destroyed by excavations at the Rovinari Coal Mine.

== See also ==
- List of castra
