= Castra of Duleu - Cornet cetate =

Fort in the Roman province of Dacia

- Location within Romania
- 45°30′42″N 21°46′40″E
- Location: Cornet Cetate, Duleu, Caraș-Severin, Romania

History
- Founded: 2nd century AD
- Built: Trajan
- Abandoned: 4th century AD

Site notes
- Condition: Ruined

The castra of Duleu was a fort in the Roman province of Dacia. It was built in the 2nd century and abandoned in the 4th century. A contemporary necropolis was also unearthed near the fort. The ruins of the castra are located in Duleu (commune Fârliug, Romania).

== See also ==
- List of castra
