= Castranova =

- Commune
- Location in Romania
- Coordinates: 44°7′N 24°1′E
- Country: Romania
- County: Dolj
- Area: 67.76 km^{2} (26.16 sq mi)
- Population (2021-12-01): 3,341
  - Density: 49.31/km^{2} (127.7/sq mi)
- Time zone: UTC+02:00 (EET)
  - Summer (DST): UTC+03:00 (EEST)
- Vehicle reg.: DJ

Castranova is a commune in Dolj County, Oltenia, Romania with a population of 3,644 people. It is composed of two villages, Castranova and Puțuri.
