= Câlnic, Gorj =

Câlnic
- Commune
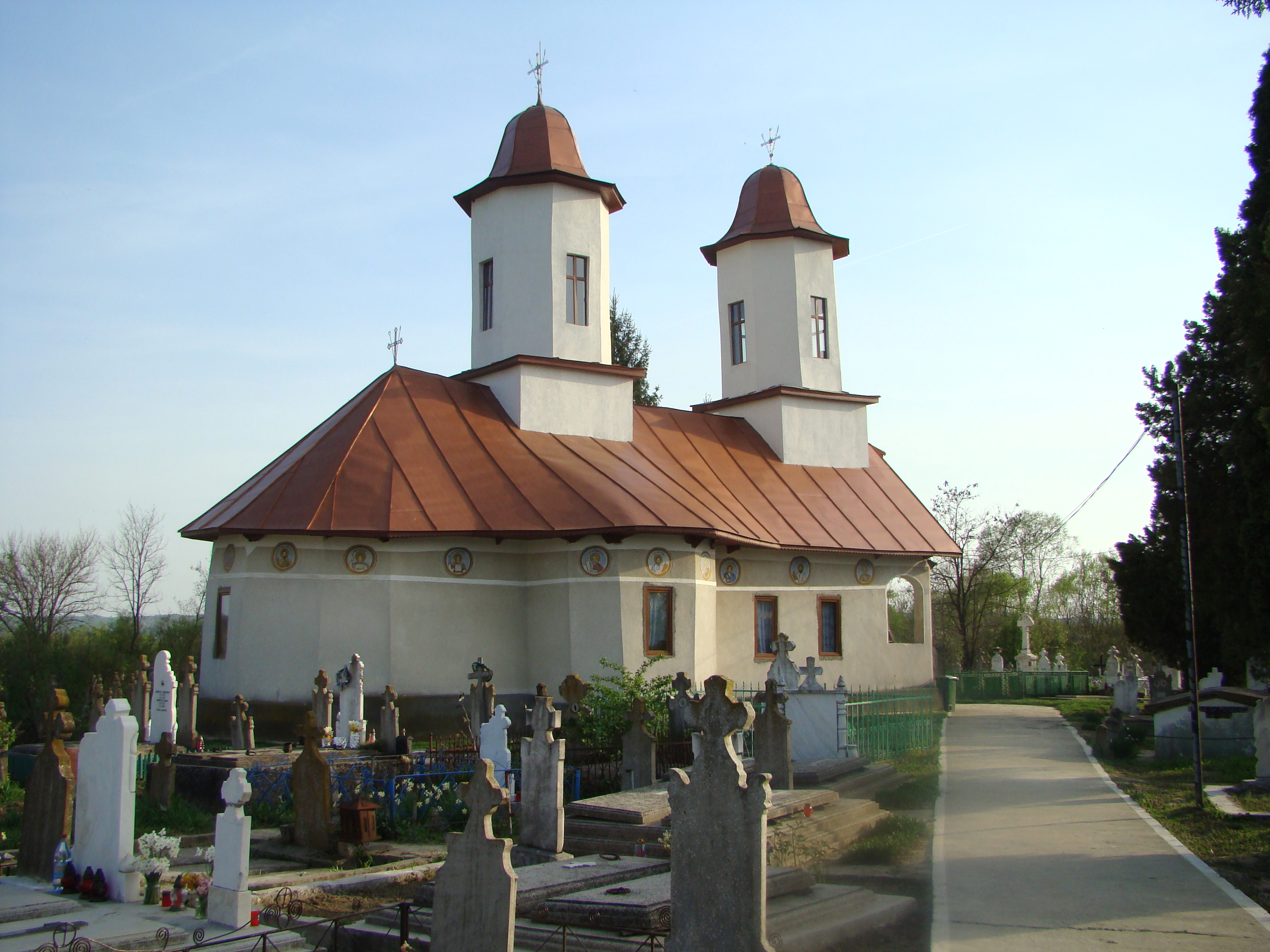
- Orthodox church in Câlnic

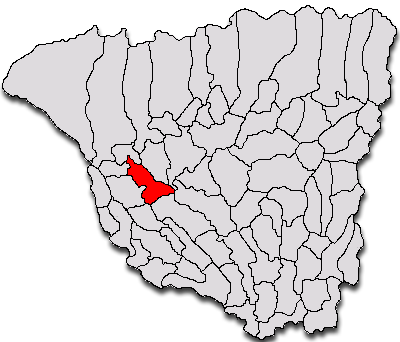
- Location in Gorj County

- Location in Romania
- Coordinates: 44.961°N 23.069°E
- Country: Romania
- County: Gorj
- Subdivisions: Câlnic, Câlnicu de Sus, Didilești, Găleșoaia, Hodoreasca, Pieptani, Pinoasa, Stejerei, Vâlceaua

Government
  - Mayor (2020–2024): Dumitru Vulpe (PNL)
- Area: 42.06 km^{2} (16.24 sq mi)
- Elevation: 176 m (577 ft)
- Population (2021-12-01): 2,214
  - Density: 52.64/km^{2} (136.3/sq mi)
- Time zone: UTC+02:00 (EET)
  - Summer (DST): UTC+03:00 (EEST)
- Postal code: 217145
- Area code: +(40) 253
- Vehicle reg.: GJ
- Website: primaria-calnic.ro

Câlnic is a commune in Gorj County, Oltenia, Romania. It is composed of nine villages: Câlnic, Câlnicu de Sus, Didilești, Găleșoaia, Hodoreasca, Pieptani, Pinoasa, Stejerei, and Vâlceaua.

== See also ==
- Castra of Pinoasa
