= Castra of Sântămărie =

Fort in the Roman province of Dacia

- Location within Romania
- 46.24617°N 24.14055°E
- Location: Sântămăriei Hill, Sântămărie, Alba, Romania

History
- Founded: 2nd century AD

Site notes
- Condition: Ruined

It was a fort in the Roman province of Dacia.

== See also ==
- List of castra
