= Castra of Bucium =

Fort in the Roman province of Dacia

- Castra of Orăștioara de Jos
- Location within Romania
- 45.7466°N 23.1713°E
- Location: Piatra Grădiștii, Bucium, Hunedoara, Romania

History
- Founded: 2nd century AD
- Abandoned: 3rd century AD

Site notes
- Excavation dates: 1959
- Archaeologists: Ioan I. Russu
- Condition: Ruined

The castra of Bucium was a fort in the Roman province of Dacia in the 2nd and 3rd centuries AD. Its ruins are located in Bucium (commune Orăștioara de Sus, Romania).

== See also ==
- Dacian fortress of Bucium
- List of castra
