= Muntenia =

Muntenia Greater Wallachia
- Historical region of Romania
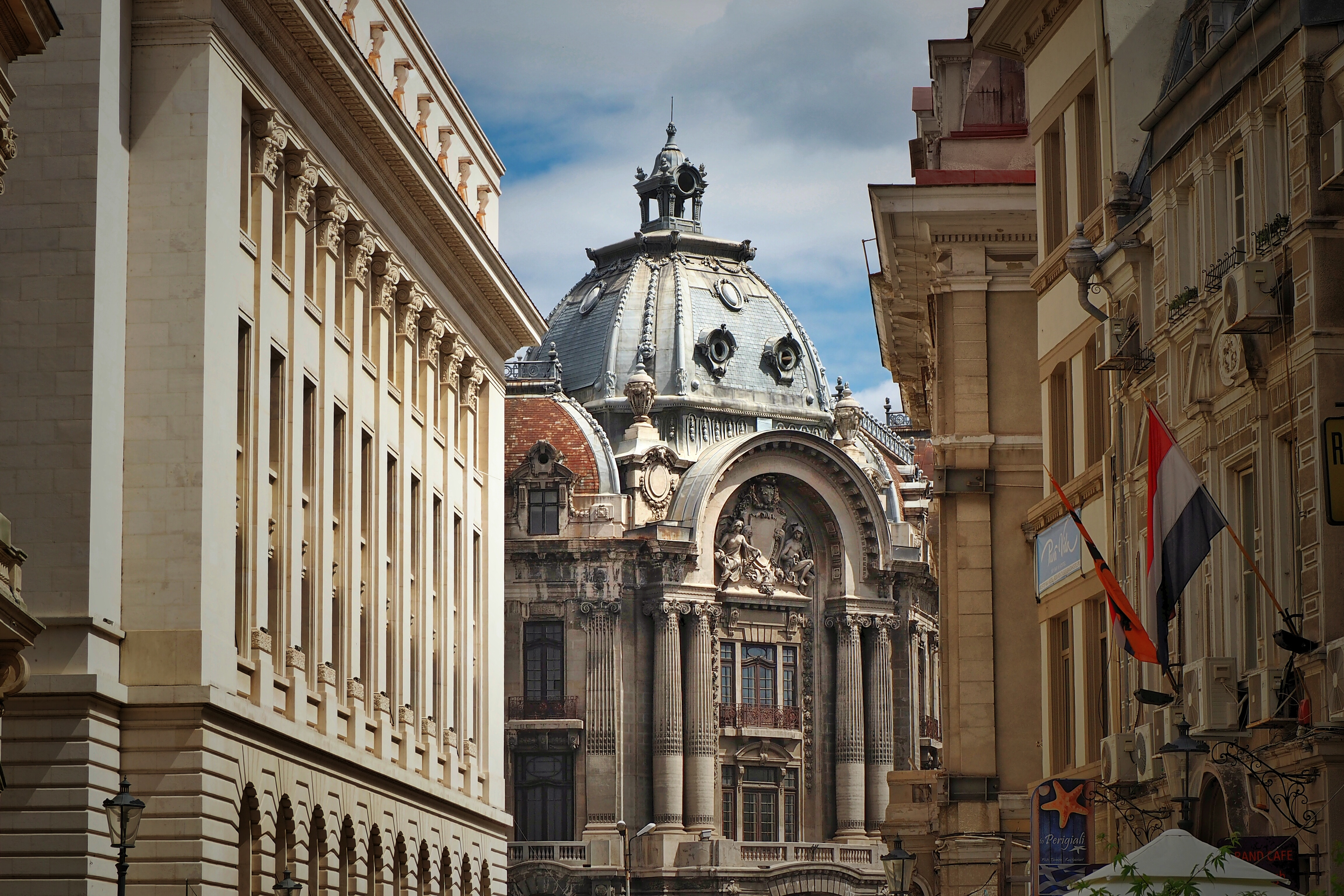
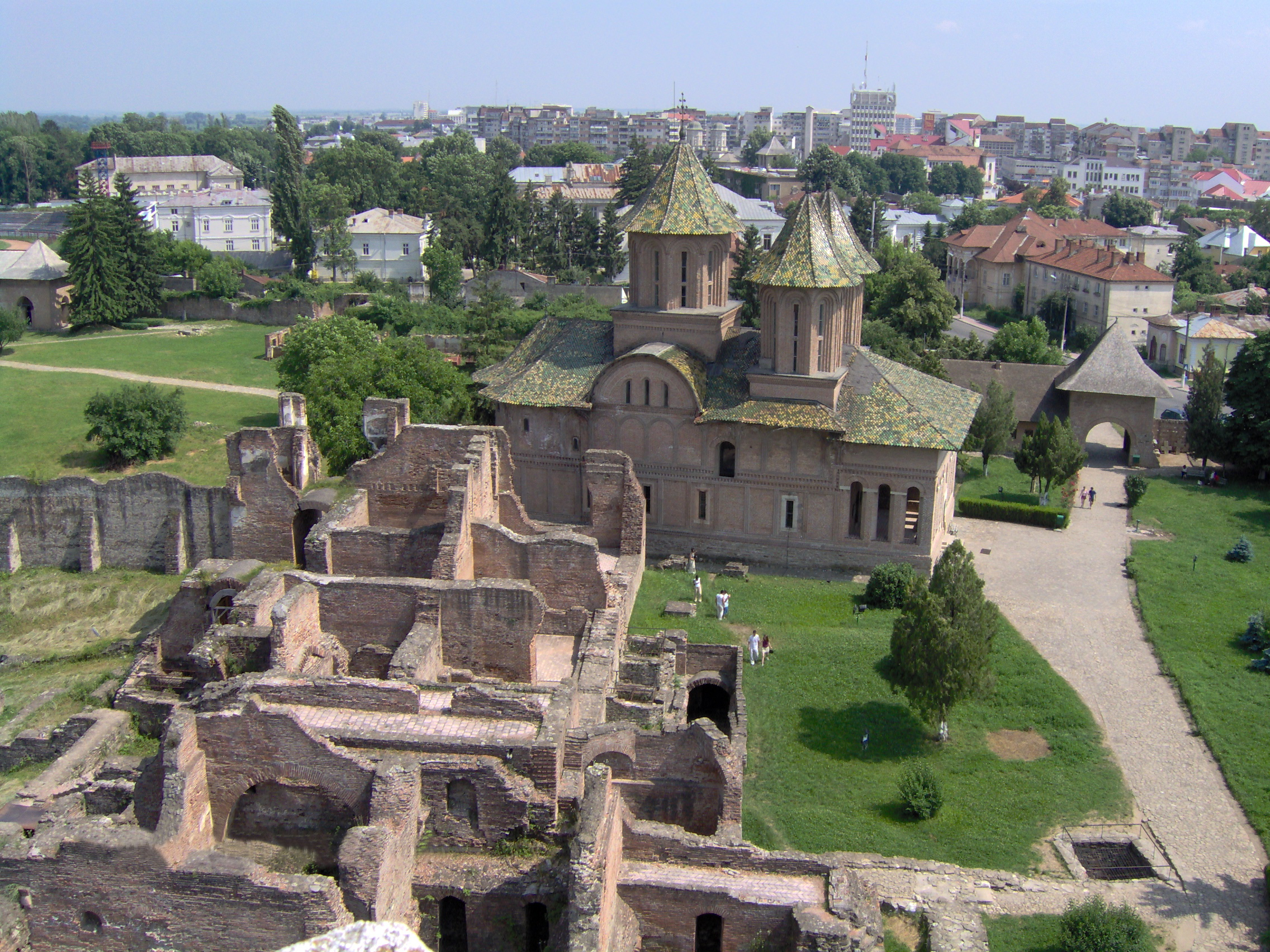
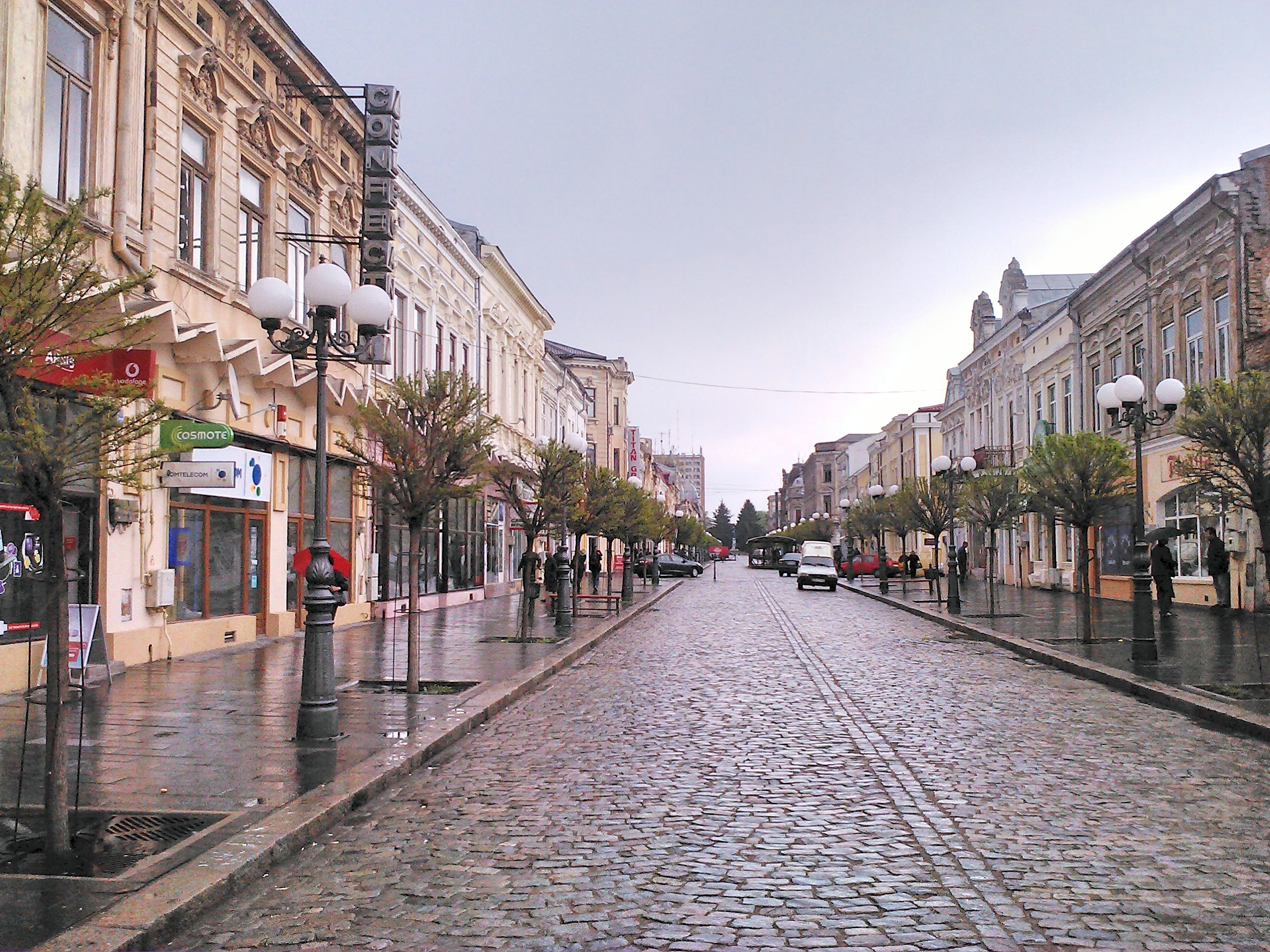
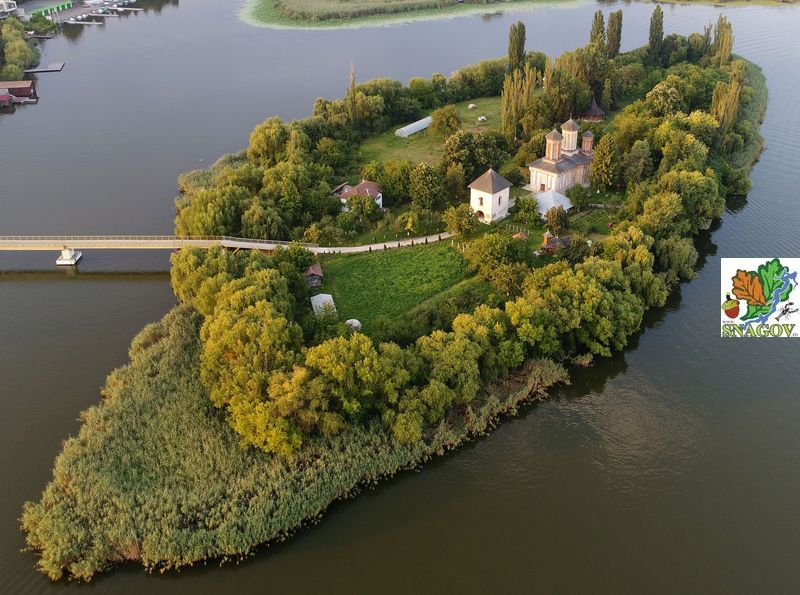
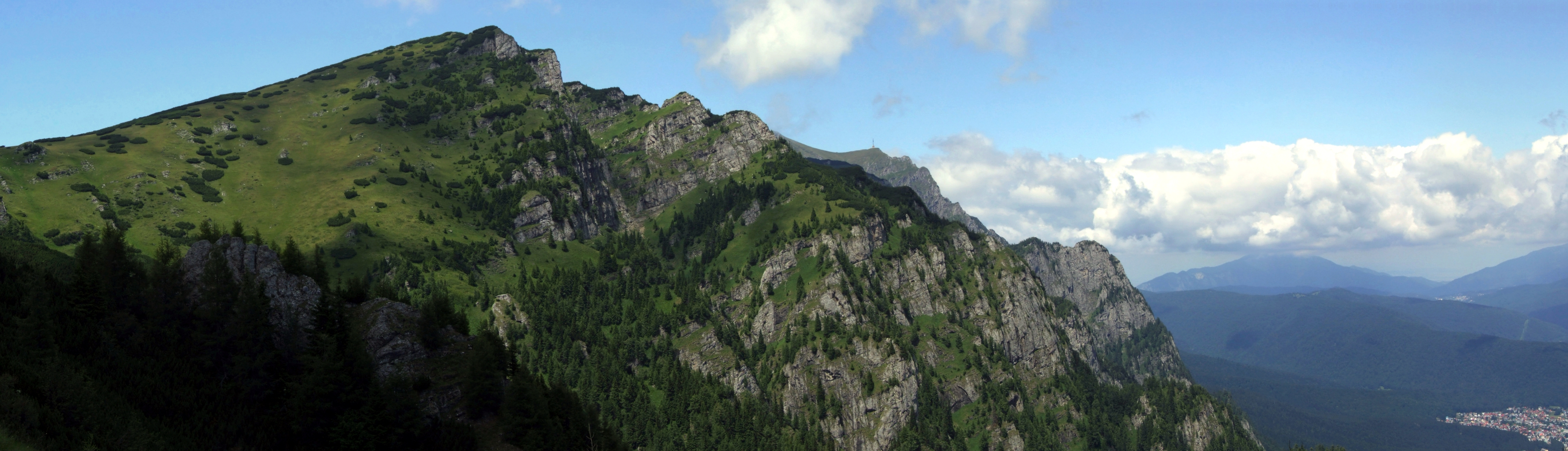
- Bucharest Târgoviște Peleș Castle Brăila Snagov Monastery Bucegi Mountains

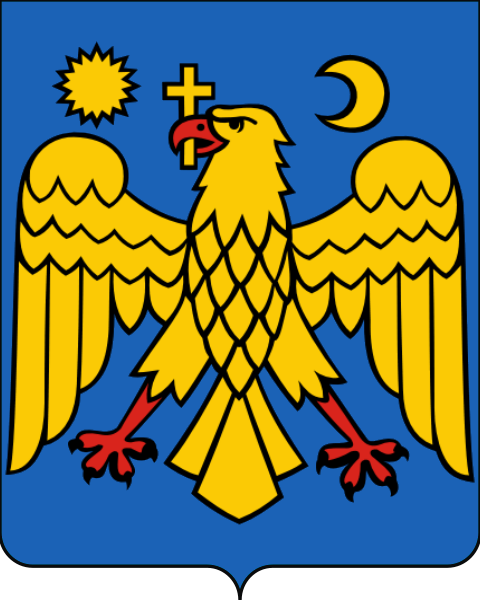
- Coat of arms

- Muntenia Oltenia, Dobruja, Western Moldavia, Bukovina, Transylvania, Banat and Crișana
- Country: Romania
- Largest city: Bucharest

Area
  - Total: 47,161 km^{2} (18,209 sq mi)

Population (2021 census)
  - Total: 5,921,110
- Demonym: Muntenian
- Time zone: UTC+2 (EET)
  - Summer (DST): UTC+3 (EEST)

Muntenia (Romanian pronunciation: [munˈteni.a], also known in English as Greater Wallachia) is a historical region of Romania, part of Wallachia (also, sometimes considered Wallachia proper, as Muntenia, Țara Românească, and the rarely used Valahia are synonyms in Romanian). It is situated between the Danube (south and east), the Carpathian Mountains (the Transylvanian Alps branch) and Moldavia (both north), and the Olt River to the west. The latter river is the border between Muntenia and Oltenia (or Lesser Wallachia). Part of the traditional border between Wallachia/Muntenia and Moldavia was formed by the rivers Milcov and Siret.

== Geography ==
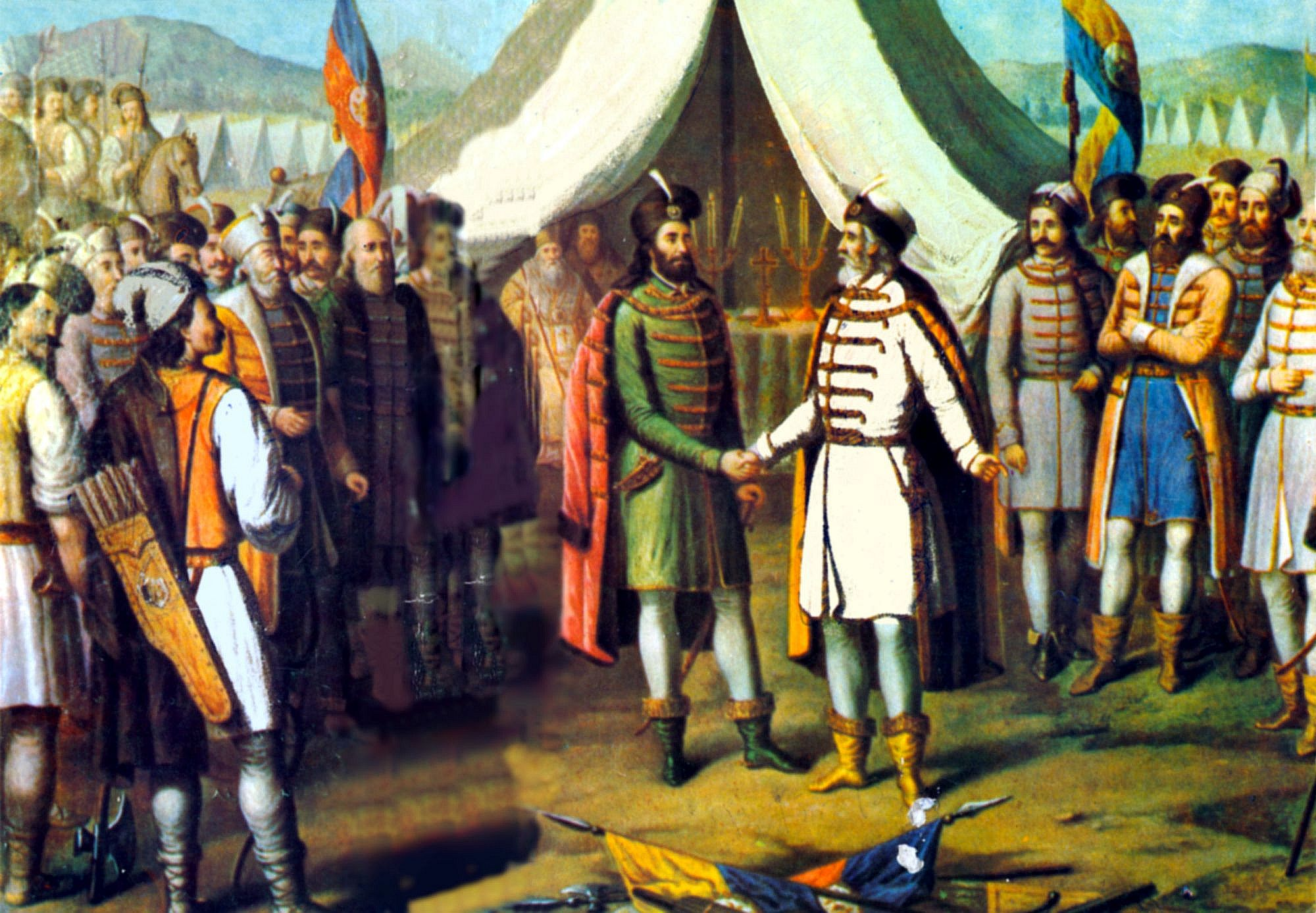
Constantin Lecca: "Moldavians and Muntenians become brothers"

Muntenia includes București - Ilfov, Sud - Muntenia, and part of the Sud-Est development regions. It consists of nine counties entirely:

- Brăila
- Buzău
- Călărași
- Argeș
- Dâmbovița
- Giurgiu
- Ialomița
- Ilfov
- Prahova

And parts of four others:

- Teleorman (the entire county with the exception of Islaz)
- Vrancea (southern part)
- Vâlcea (eastern part)
- Olt (eastern part)

Romania's capital city, Bucharest, is situated in Muntenia. Other important cities are:

- Brăila
- Buzău
- Pitești
- Ploiești
- Târgoviște
