= Cioroiași =

- Commune
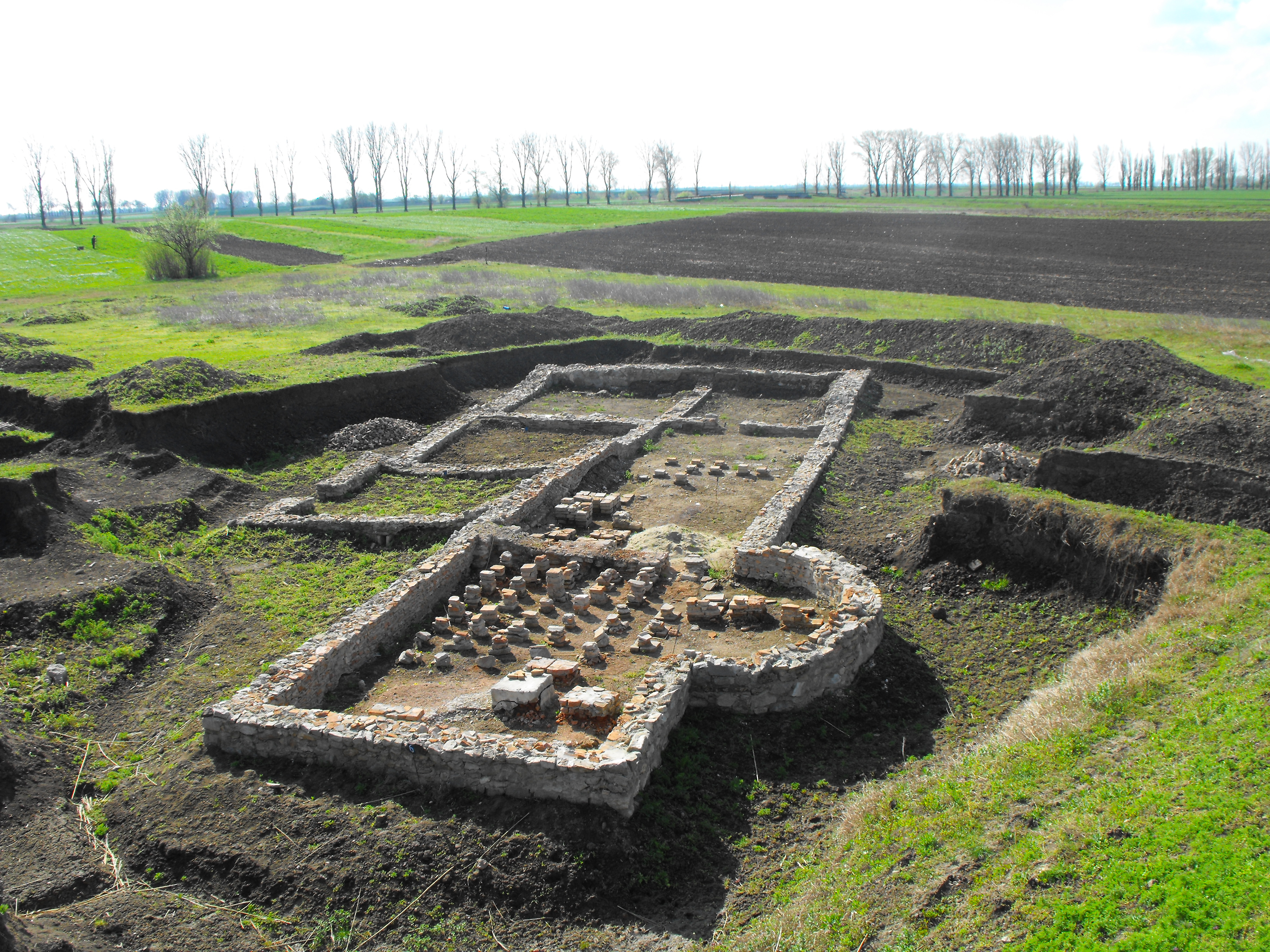
- Archaeological site in Cioroiu Nou

- Location in Romania
- Coordinates: 44°5′N 23°27′E
- Country: Romania
- County: Dolj

Government
  - Mayor (2020–2024): Ștefan Cătălin Dănilă (PSD)
- Area: 48.14 km^{2} (18.59 sq mi)
- Elevation: 74 m (243 ft)
- Population (2021-12-01): 1,463
  - Density: 30.39/km^{2} (78.71/sq mi)
- Time zone: UTC+02:00 (EET)
  - Summer (DST): UTC+03:00 (EEST)
- Postal code: 207195
- Area code: +(40) 251
- Vehicle reg.: DJ
- Website: www.comunacioroiasi.ro

Cioroiași is a commune in Dolj County, Oltenia, Romania with a population of 1,463 people as of 2021. It is composed of three villages: Cetățuia, Cioroiași, and Cioroiu Nou.
