= Islaz =

- Commune
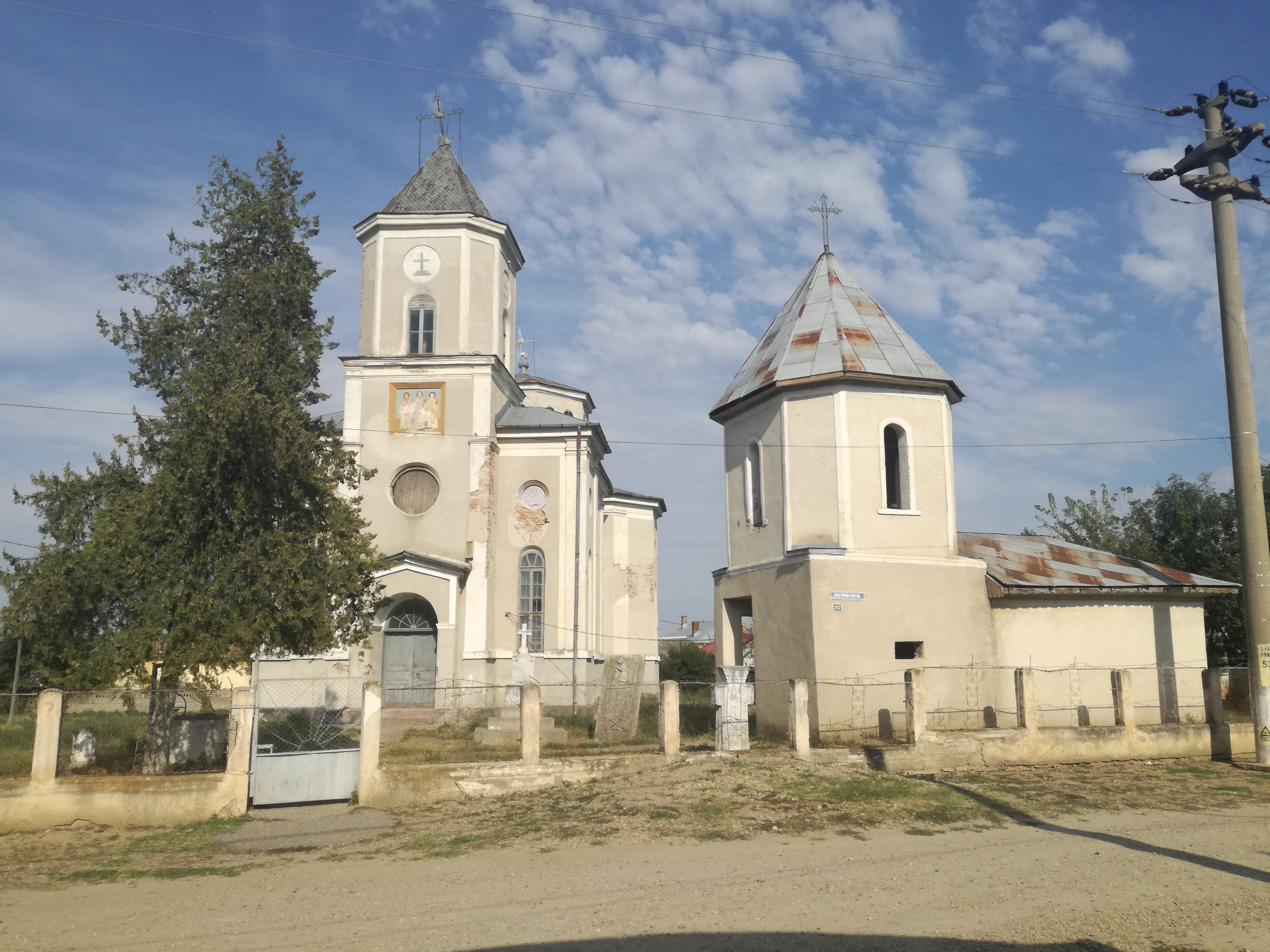
- Church of the Holy Three Hierarchs, Islaz

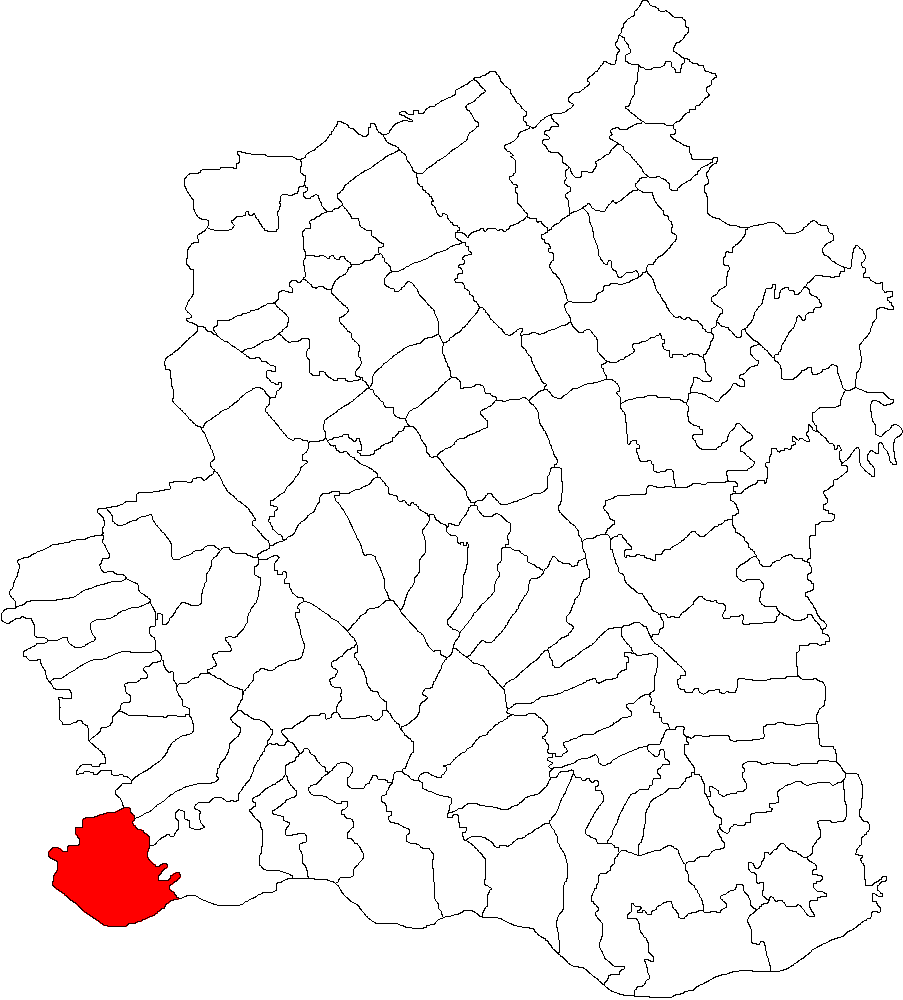
- Location in Teleorman County

- Location in Romania
- Coordinates: 43°44′N 24°45′E
- Country: Romania
- County: Teleorman
- Subdivisions: Islaz, Moldoveni

Government
  - Mayor (2020–2024): Ion Gheorghe Cătălin Geară (PSD)
- Area: 96.41 km^{2} (37.22 sq mi)
- Elevation: 32 m (105 ft)
- Population (2021-12-01): 4,256
  - Density: 44.14/km^{2} (114.3/sq mi)
- Time zone: UTC+02:00 (EET)
  - Summer (DST): UTC+03:00 (EEST)
- Postal code: 147160
- Vehicle reg.: TR
- Website: islaztr.ro

Islaz (Romanian pronunciation: [isˈlaz]) is a commune in southern Romania, located in the southwestern Teleorman County, 10 km (6.2 mi) west of Turnu Măgurele. It is part of the historical province Oltenia, and is composed of two villages, Islaz and Moldoveni.

The commune is situated in the southern reaches of the Wallachian Plain, where the Olt River discharges into the Danube River. To the south, across the Danube, is Bulgaria; to the east, across the Olt, is Turnu Măgurele; and to the west and to the north is Olt County.

Islaz village was first attested on July 9, 1569, and until 1950 was a part of the former Romanați County. It became notorious in 1848, as the site where the Proclamation of Islaz, listing the goals of the Wallachian Revolution, was publicly read (June 9, 1848).

Ostrovul Mare is a nature reserve located on two (joined) islands on the Danube, Ostrovul Mare and Ostrovul Calnovăț, in the vicinity of Islaz.
