= Fârliug =

- Commune
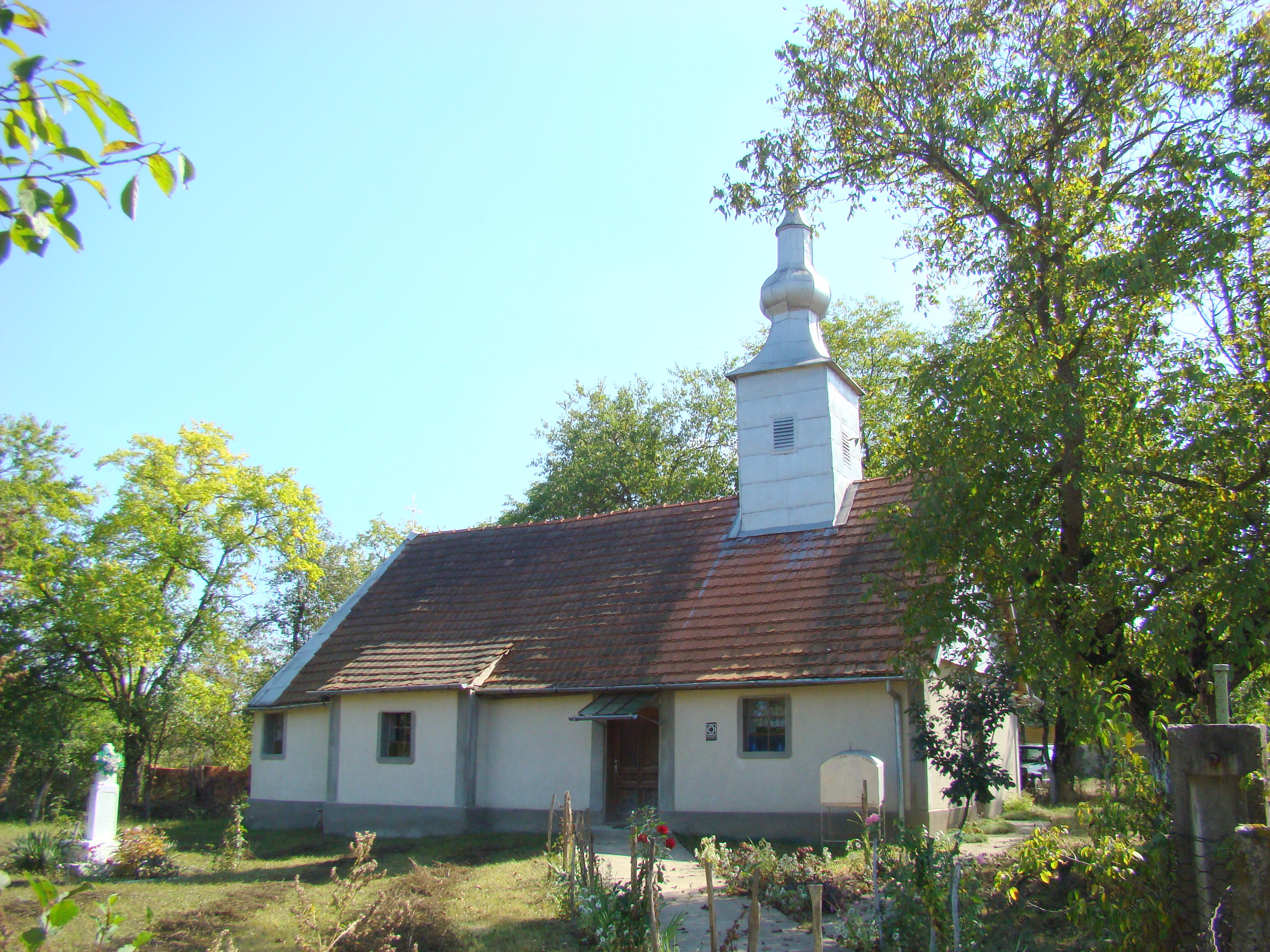
- Wooden church in Valea Mare

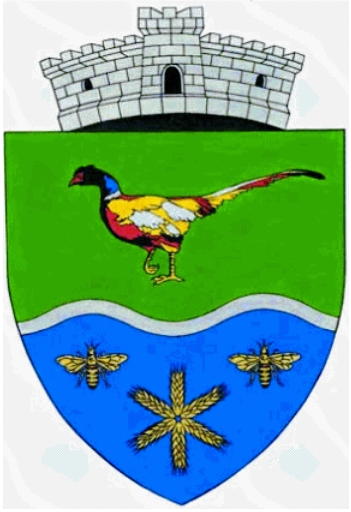
- Coat of arms

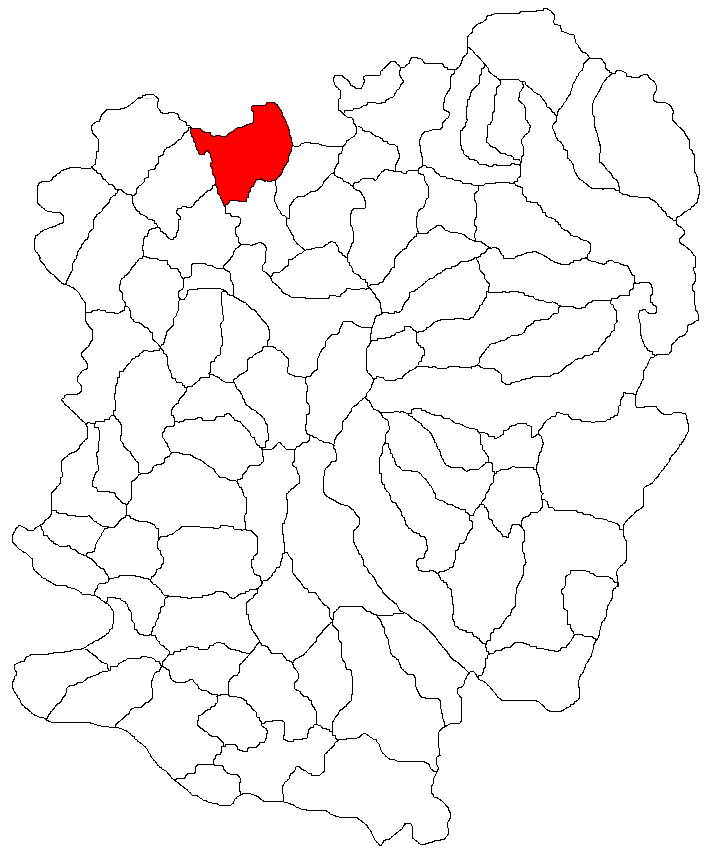
- Location in Caraș-Severin County

- Location in Romania
- Coordinates: 45°29′N 21°51′E
- Country: Romania
- County: Caraș-Severin

Government
  - Mayor (2024–2028): Elena-Adriana Sărăor (PNL)
- Area: 130.47 km^{2} (50.37 sq mi)
- Elevation: 185 m (607 ft)
- Population (2021-12-01): 1,736
  - Density: 13.31/km^{2} (34.46/sq mi)
- Time zone: UTC+02:00 (EET)
  - Summer (DST): UTC+03:00 (EEST)
- Postal code: 327200
- Area code: (+40) 02 55
- Vehicle reg.: CS
- Website: comuna-firliug.ro

Fârliug (Hungarian: Furlug) is a commune in Caraș-Severin County, western Romania. It is composed of six villages: Dezești (Dezesd), Duleu (Dulló), Fârliug, Remetea-Pogănici (Pogányosremete), Scăiuș (Bojtorjános), and Valea Mare (Pogányosvölgy).

The commune is situated in the historical region of Banat, in the northern part of the county, on the border with Timiș County. Fârliug is located 27 km (17 mi) north of Reșița, the capital of Caraș-Severin County, and 46 km (29 mi) south of Lugoj. It is crossed by national road DN58A.

Historical population
Year	Pop.	±%
1880	2,101	—
1910	2,643	+25.8%
1930	2,436	−7.8%
2002	2,254	−7.5%
2011	1,956	−13.2%
2021	1,736	−11.2%
Source: Census data

At the 2011 census, the commune had a population of 1,956 people, of which 88.65% were Romanians, 2.2% Ukrainians, 1.69% Roma, and 1.18% Czechs. At the 2021 census, the commune had a population of 1,736; of those, 92% were Romanians.

== Natives ==
- Jiří Kormaník (1935–2017), amateur wrestler.
- Ioan Sauca (born 1956), priest of the Romanian Orthodox Church, academic, and acting general secretary of the World Council of Churches.

== See also ==
- Castra of Duleu - Odăi
- Castra of Duleu - Cornet cetate
