= Orăștioara de Sus =

- Commune
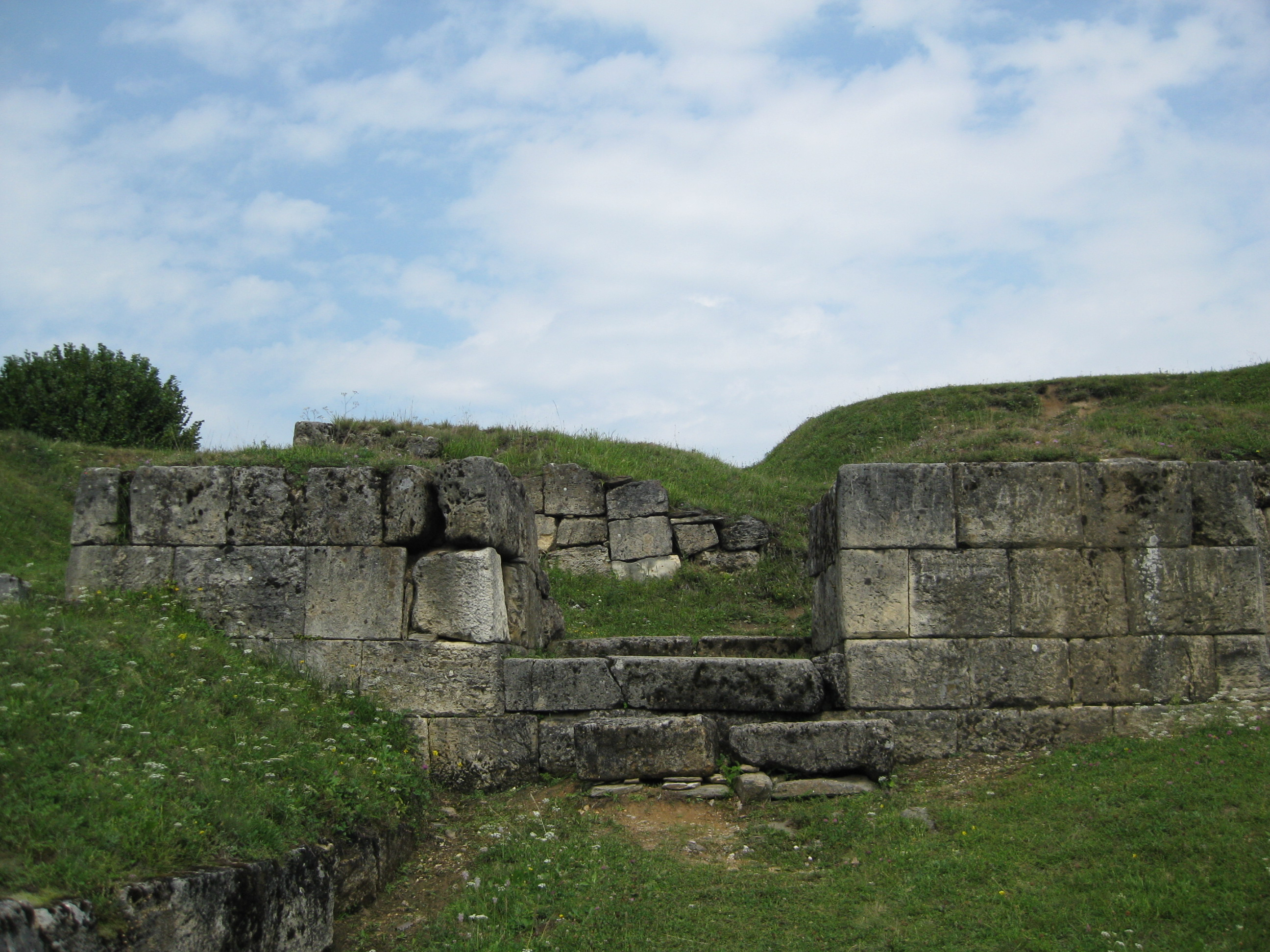
- Ruins of the ancient Dacian fortress of Blidaru

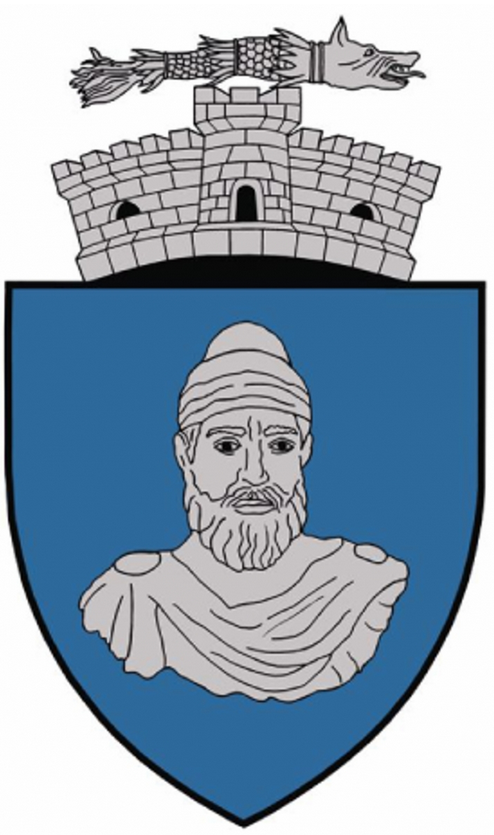
- Coat of arms

- Location in Hunedoara County

- Location in Romania
- Coordinates: 45°44′N 23°10′E
- Country: Romania
- County: Hunedoara

Government
  - Mayor (2024–2028): Vasile-Marian Inășescu (PNL)
- Area: 229.30 km^{2} (88.53 sq mi)
- Elevation: 322 m (1,056 ft)
- Population (2021-12-01): 1,910
  - Density: 8.33/km^{2} (21.6/sq mi)
- Time zone: UTC+02:00 (EET)
  - Summer (DST): UTC+03:00 (EEST)
- Postal code: 337325
- Area code: (+40) 0254
- Vehicle reg.: HD
- Website: comuna-orastioaradesus.ro

Orăștioara de Sus (Hungarian: Felsővárosvíz, German: Ober-Brooserbach) is a commune in Hunedoara County, Transylvania, Romania. It is composed of eight villages: Bucium (Bucsum), Costești (Kosztesd), Costești-Deal, Grădiștea de Munte (Gredistye), Ludeștii de Jos (Ludesd), Ludeștii de Sus (Felsőludesd), Ocolișu Mic (Kisoklos), and Orăștioara de Sus.

Two of the Dacian Fortresses of the Orăștie Mountains, Costești-Cetățuie and Costești-Blidaru, are located near Costești village. A third, Sarmizegetusa Regia, is located near Grădiștea de Munte. A Roman fort is located near Bucium village.

Historical population
Year	Pop.	±%
1850	2,995	—
1910	3,629	+21.2%
2002	2,442	−32.7%
2011	2,079	−14.9%
2021	1,910	−8.1%
Source: Census data
