= Gresia =

Gresia may refer to several villages in Romania:

- Gresia, a village in Bozioru Commune, Buzău County
- Gresia, a village in Starchiojd Commune, Prahova County
- Gresia fort, a Roman fort near the village in Stejaru, Teleorman
