= Castra of Fâlfani =

Roman fort in Dacia

- Location within Romania
- 44°36′N 24°45′E
- Location: Fâlfani, Argeș, Romania

History
- Founded: 2nd century AD
- Abandoned: 3rd century AD

Site notes
- Condition: Ruined

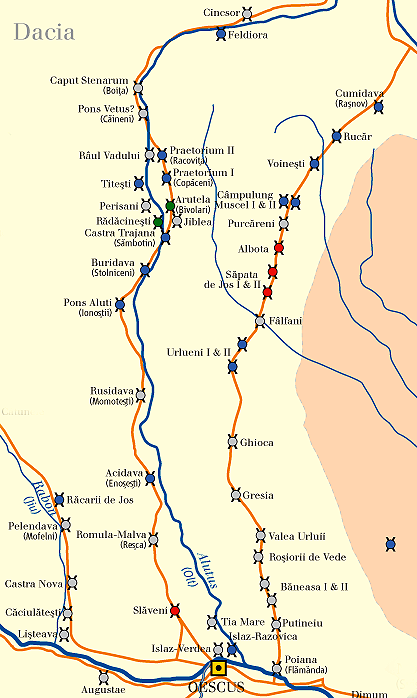
Limes Translutanus (right line) and Lutanus (left line) of the Roman limes in Dacia

The castra of Fâlfani was a fort built in the 2nd century AD in the Roman province of Dacia. It was part of the Roman frontier system of the Limes Transalutanus.

It was abandoned in the 3rd century. Its ruins are located on a hill in Fâlfani (commune Stolnici, Romania).

== See also ==
- List of castra
