= Castra of Albota =

Fort in the Roman province of Dacia

- Location within Romania
- 44°47′N 24°50′E
- Location: Albota, Argeș, Romania

History
- Founded: 2nd century AD

Site notes
- Condition: Ruined

The Castra of Albota was a castrum (Roman fort) in the province of Dacia. It was built after 161 AD as part of the Limes Transalutanus.

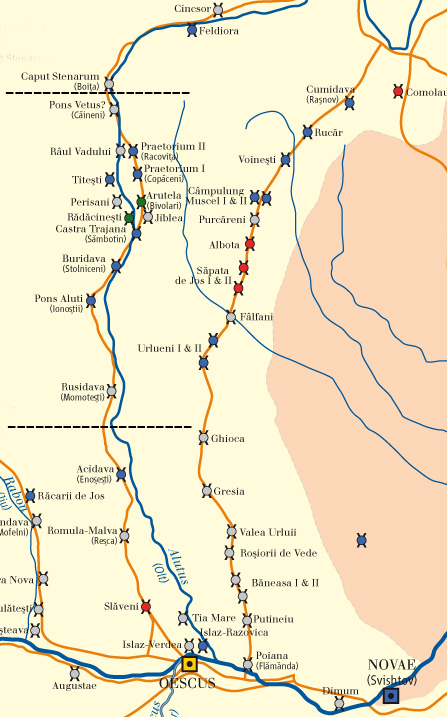
Limes Alutanus + Transalutanus (right)

== See also ==
- List of castra
