= Gresia Roman fort =

- Location within Romania
- 44°10′N 24°55′E
- Location: Gresia, Teleorman, Romania

History
- Founded: 2nd century AD
- Abandoned: 3rd century AD

Site notes
- Condition: Ruined

Gresia Roman fort is located in the present Gresia (commune Stejaru, Romania). It was in the Roman province of Dacia and dates from the 2nd and 3rd centuries AD. It was part of the frontier system of the Limes Transalutanus.

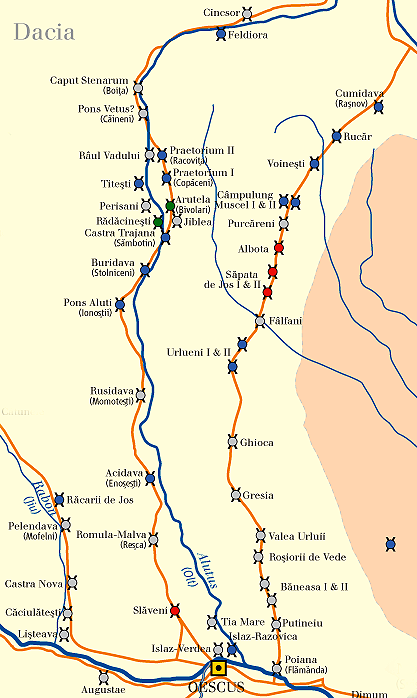
Limes Alutanus + Transalutanus (right)

== See also ==
- List of castra
