= Castra of Drumul Carului =

Fort in the Roman province of Dacia

- Location within Romania
- 45°27′44″N 25°17′26″E
- Location: La cetate, Drumul Carului, Brașov, Romania

History
- Founded: 2nd century AD
- Abandoned: 3rd century AD

Site notes
- Condition: Ruined

The castra of Drumul Carului was a fort in the Roman province of Dacia near Moieciu, Romania.

It was part of the Roman frontier system of the Limes Transalutanus and was in a strategic position south of the Bran Pass.

The small fort (castellum), approx. 40×40 m, was defended by earth works with two ditches. It might have been erected following the First Dacian War before the official integration of Dacia to the Roman Empire. Destroyed by fire, the fort was abandoned around 250.

== See also ==
- List of castra
