= Limes Transalutanus =

Fortified frontier system of the Roman Empire

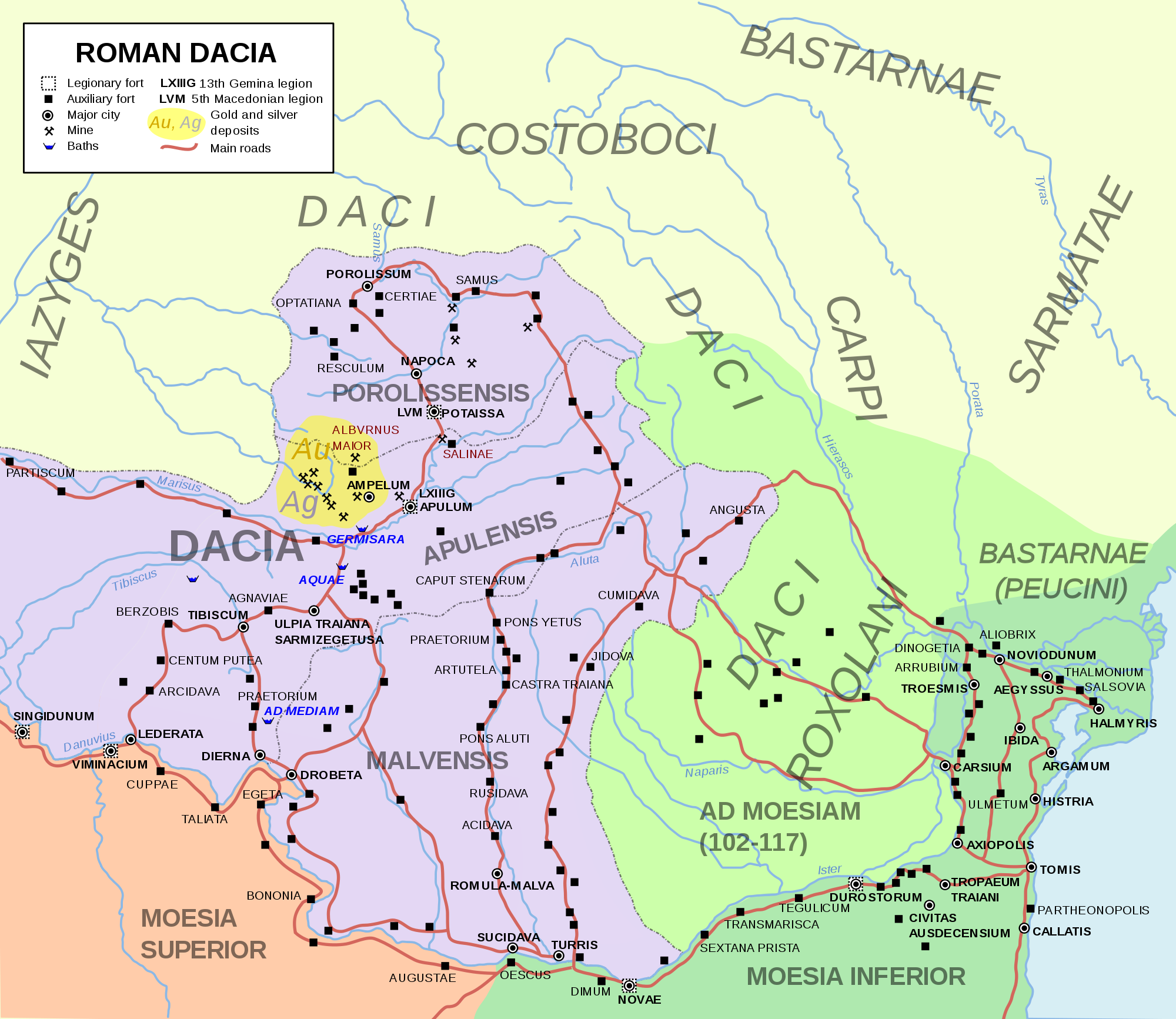
Roman Dacia

Limes Transalutanus (red dotted line) shown in modern Romania

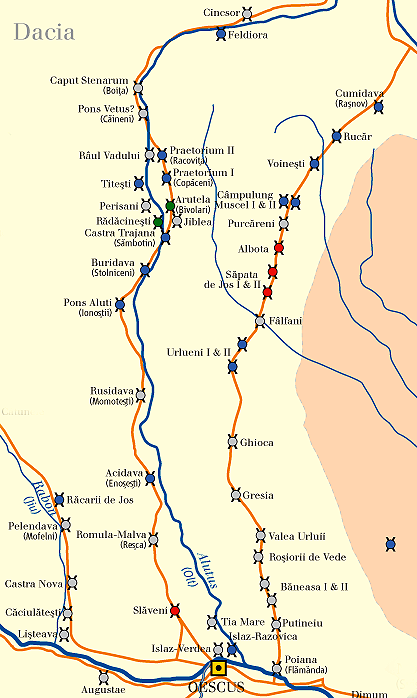
Forts on Limes Transalutanus (to the right)

Limes Transalutanus is the modern name given to a fortified frontier system of the Roman Empire, built on the western edge of Teleorman's forests as part of the Dacian Limes in the Roman province of Dacia, modern-day Romania.

The Limes Transalutanus, of 235 km length, was needed to shorten the line of communication to the strategic fort at Angustia by almost 30 per cent compared to the earlier route via the Limes Alutanus.

In first half of the 3rd century AD Septimius Severus advanced the province's eastern frontier by some 14 km (8.7 mi) east of the existing Limes Alutanus although the road and many of the forts on the Limes date from the end of Trajan's Dacian Wars (c.106 AD). Between 244–247, after the Carpian and Getae (or Goths) attacks, Philip the Arab abandoned the limes for some time. The Romans returned to the limes but closed the road to the Rucăr-Bran pass starting from the modern village of Băiculeşti.

The frontier system was composed of a road linking military forts and towers and in the southern, less mountainous, part a 3 m high vallum 10–12 m wide reinforced with wooden palisades on stone walls and also a ditch. In this southern part the limes was parallel to Olt river at a distance varying from 5 to 30 km east of the river.

Later, another limes was built in the area, known as Brazda lui Novac.

== Forts ==
Known forts on the Limes Transalutanus include (from the north):

- Cumidava (castra)
- Castra of Drumul Carului
- Jidava (castra) also called Campulung Muscel
- Castra of Albota
- Săpata
- Castra of Fâlfani
- Gresia Roman fort
- Castra of Băneasa
- Castra of Poiana

== See also ==
- Limes (Roman Empire)
- Limes Alutanus
- Limes Porolissensis
- Brazda lui Novac
