= Castra of Poiana =

Fort in the Roman province of Dacia

- Castra of Ciuperceni
- Location within Romania
- 43.7323°N 24.9841°E
- Location: La culă, Poiana, Teleorman, Romania

History
- Founded: 2nd century AD
- Abandoned: 3rd century AD

Site notes
- Condition: Ruined

The castra of Poiana was a fort in the Roman province of Dacia near the present town of Poiana (previously Flamanda) . It was built in the 2nd century AD and abandoned in the next century. It was a part of the Limes Transalutanus frontier system and situated at the southern end next to the Danube (and a presumed crossing point).

== See also ==
- List of castra
