= Stejaru, Teleorman =

Stejaru
- Commune
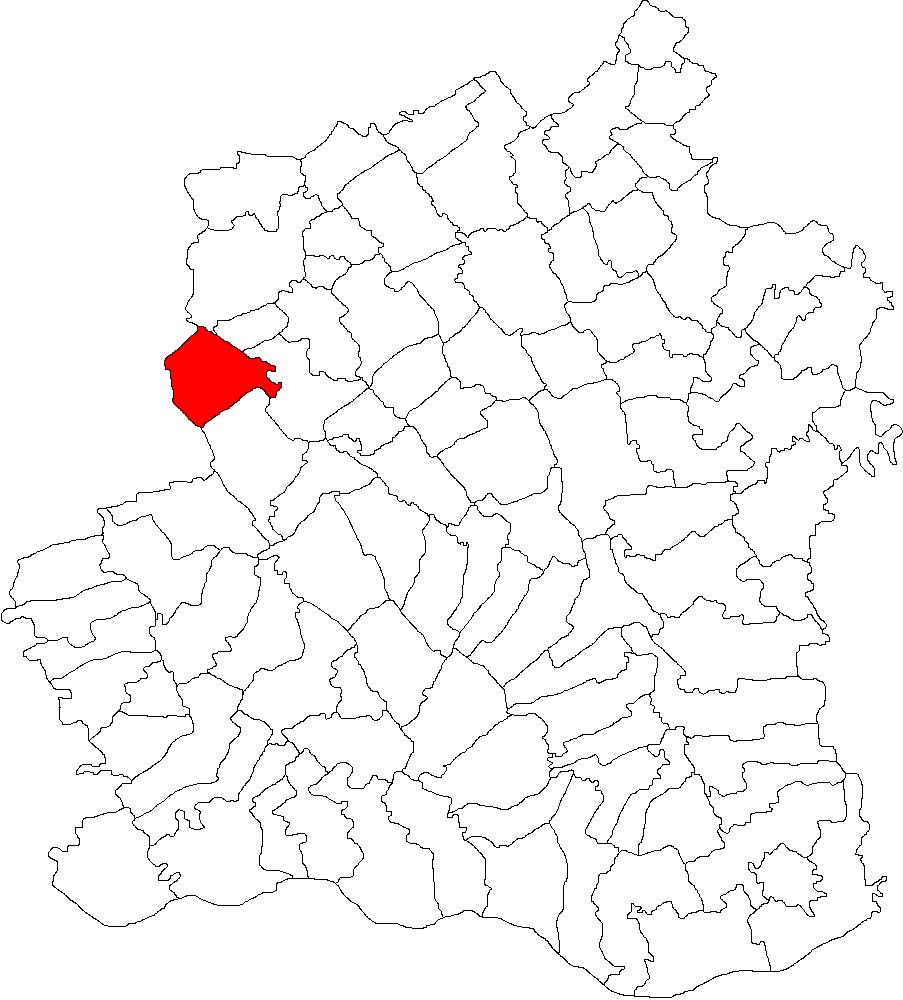
- Location in Teleorman County

- Location in Romania
- Coordinates: 44°11′N 24°53′E
- Country: Romania
- County: Teleorman
- Subdivisions: Bratcovu, Gresia, Socetu, Stejaru

Government
  - Mayor (2024–2028): Alexandru Moise (PSD)
- Area: 58.96 km^{2} (22.76 sq mi)
- Elevation: 113 m (371 ft)
- Population (2021-12-01): 1,624
  - Density: 28/km^{2} (71/sq mi)
- Time zone: EET/EEST (UTC+2/+3)
- Postal code: 147365
- Area code: +(40) 247
- Vehicle reg.: TR
- Website: primariastejaru.ro

Stejaru is a commune in Teleorman County, Muntenia, Romania. It is composed of four villages: Bratcovu, Gresia, Socetu, and Stejaru.
