= Pietroasele fort =

Castra of Pietroasele
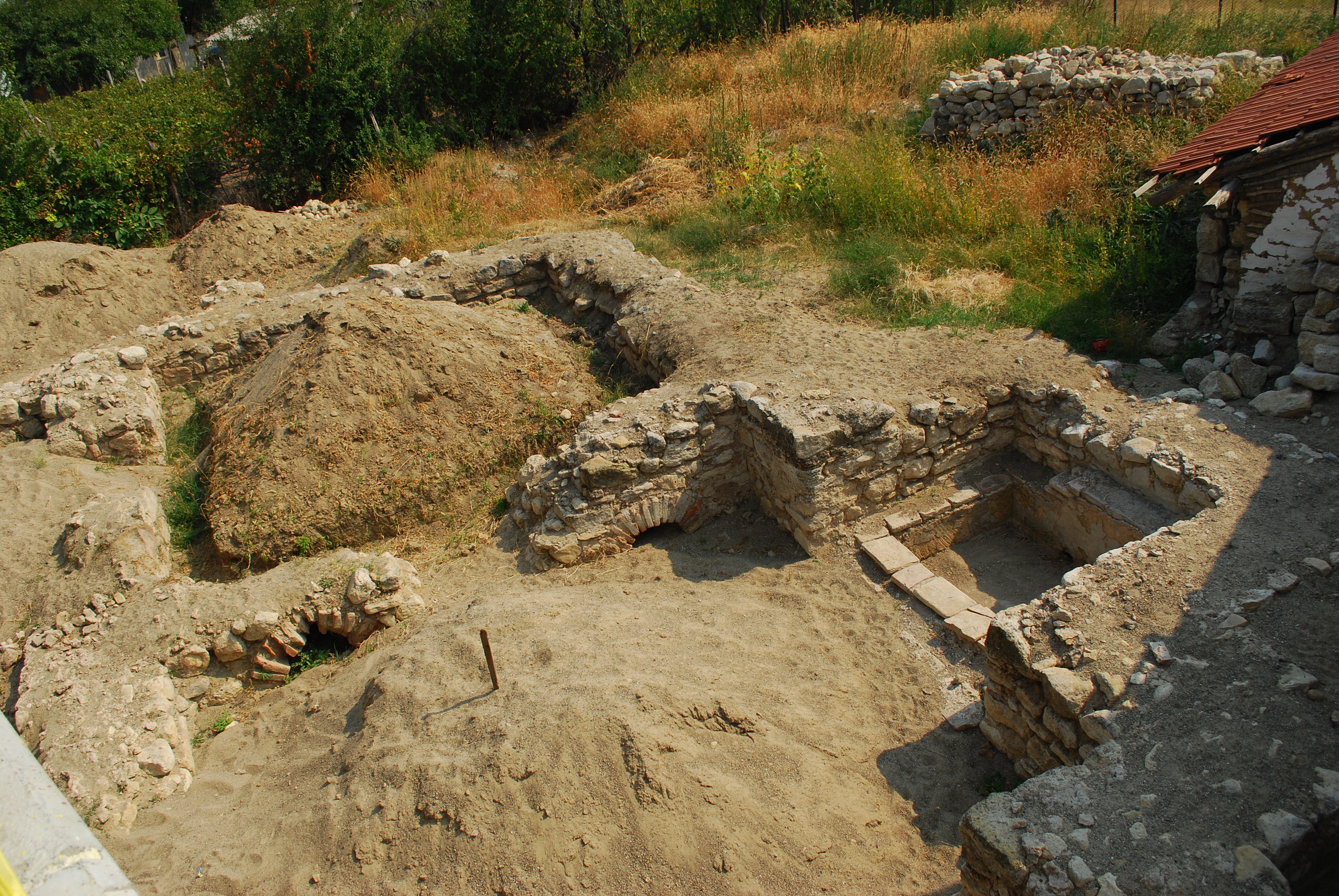
- Thaermae

- Location within Romania
- 45.09384°N 26.57826°E
- Location: Pietroasele, Buzău, Romania

History
- Abandoned: 3rd century AD

The castra of Pietroasele (also called Pietroasa de Jos) was a Roman fort in Roman Dacia located in the centre of Pietroasele (Romania). It was built under Trajan after Trajan's Dacian Wars in about 106 AD but abandoned at the beginning of Hadrian's reign when Wallachia was given up to the Roxolani. It was used again at the beginning of the 3rd century in the reign of Caracalla. It was rebuilt by Constantine the Great after his victory over the Goths in 328 when Constantine created the Constantine Wall of the Dacian Limes. It was abandoned in the same century.

It measured 124x158 m with walls 2.7 m thick. It was situated well beyond the Danubian Limes and was connected to bridge-head forts (Sucidava, castra of Tirighina-Bărboși, and the unlocated Constantiniana Daphne) along the left bank of the Danube river.

The baths at Pietroasele are located some 500 m east of the fort and built in the first years of the 2nd century AD, and reused during the 4th century AD. Some stamped bricks of Legio XI Claudia Pia Fidelis from Durostorum, specific to the Trajan era, were discovered.

Roman cities, forts and roads

There is a small museum on the site.

The Pietroasele Treasure was found nearby, a late 4th-century Gothic treasure that included some twenty-two objects of gold.

== Gallery ==
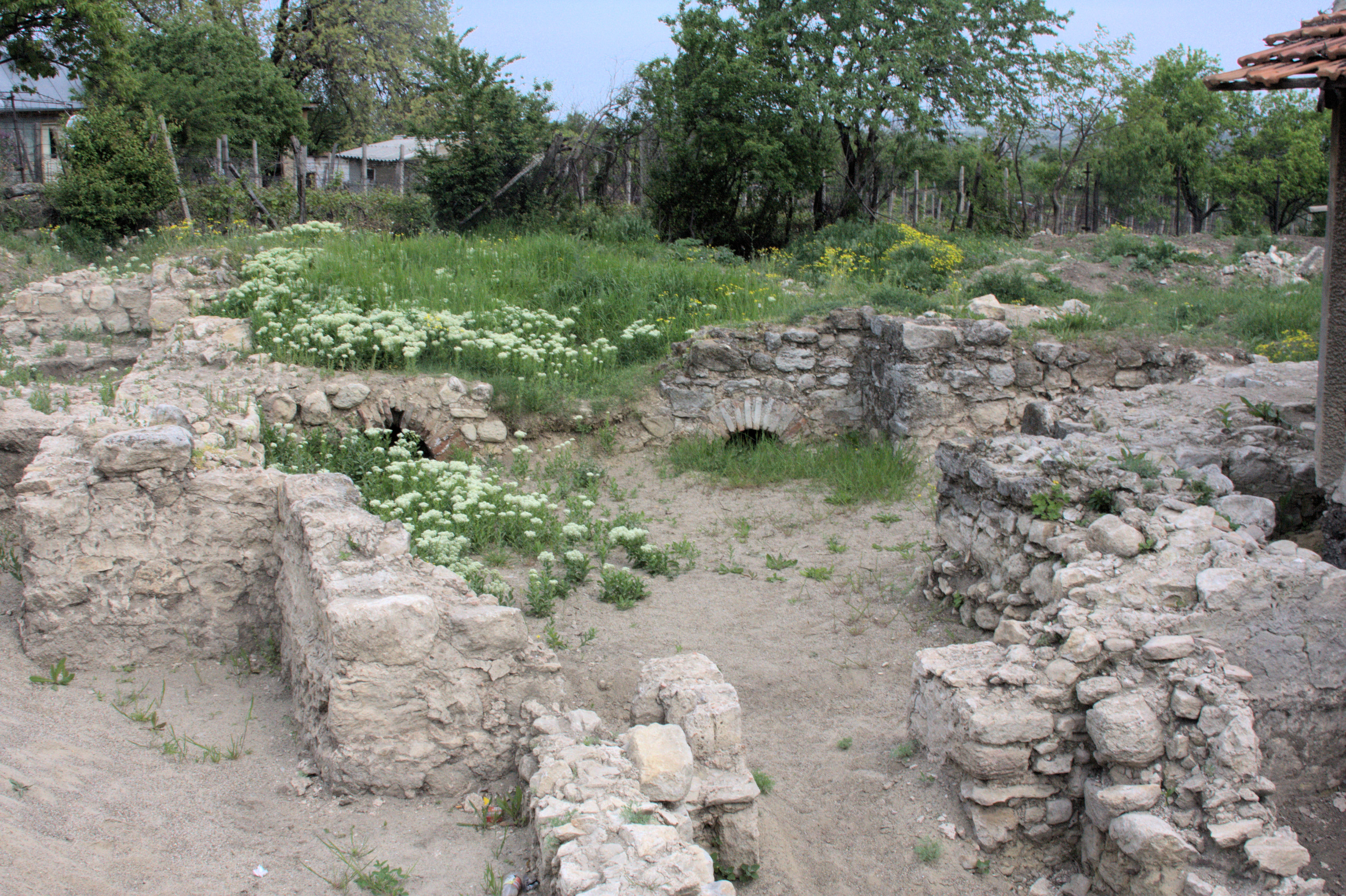

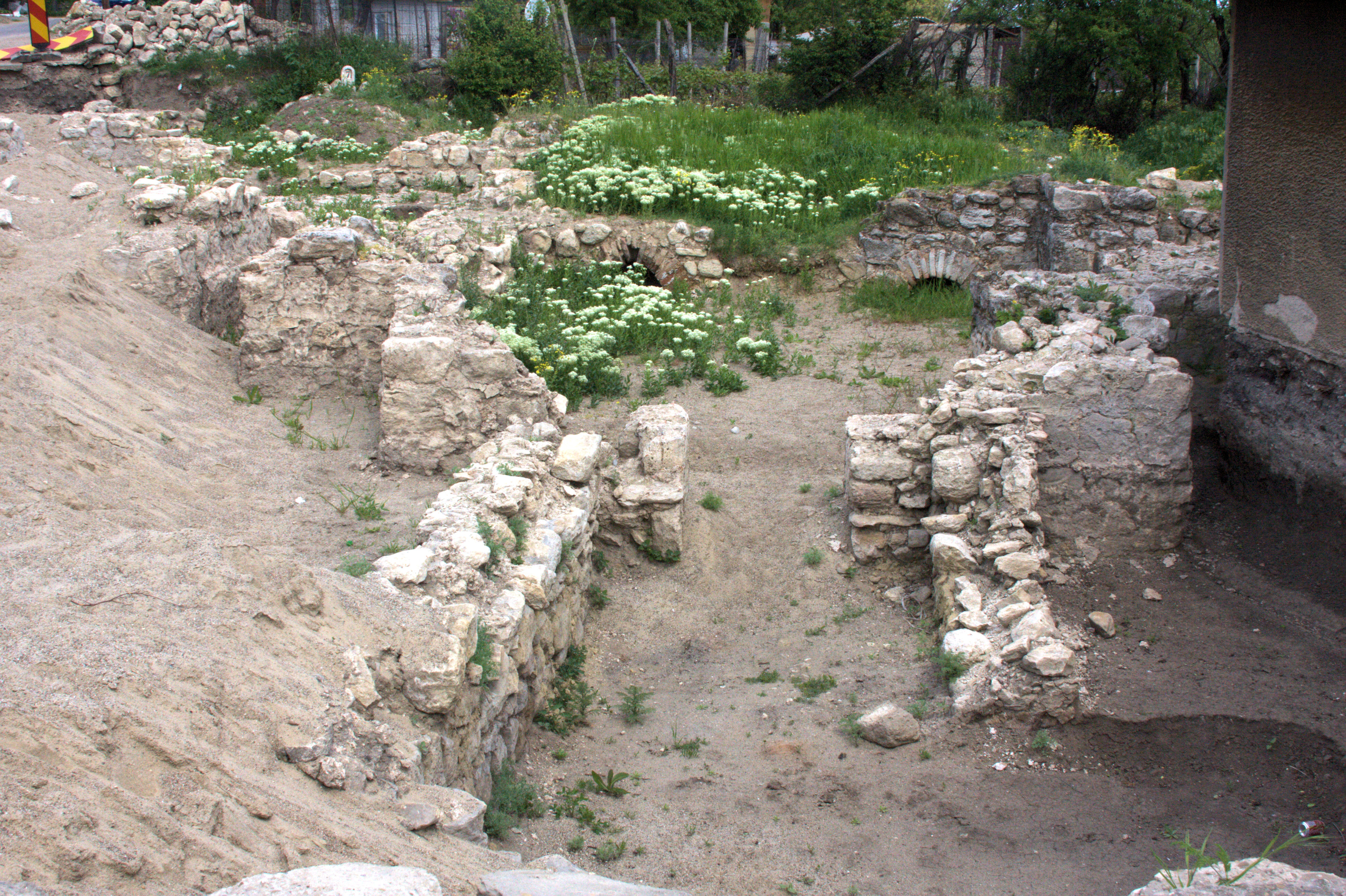

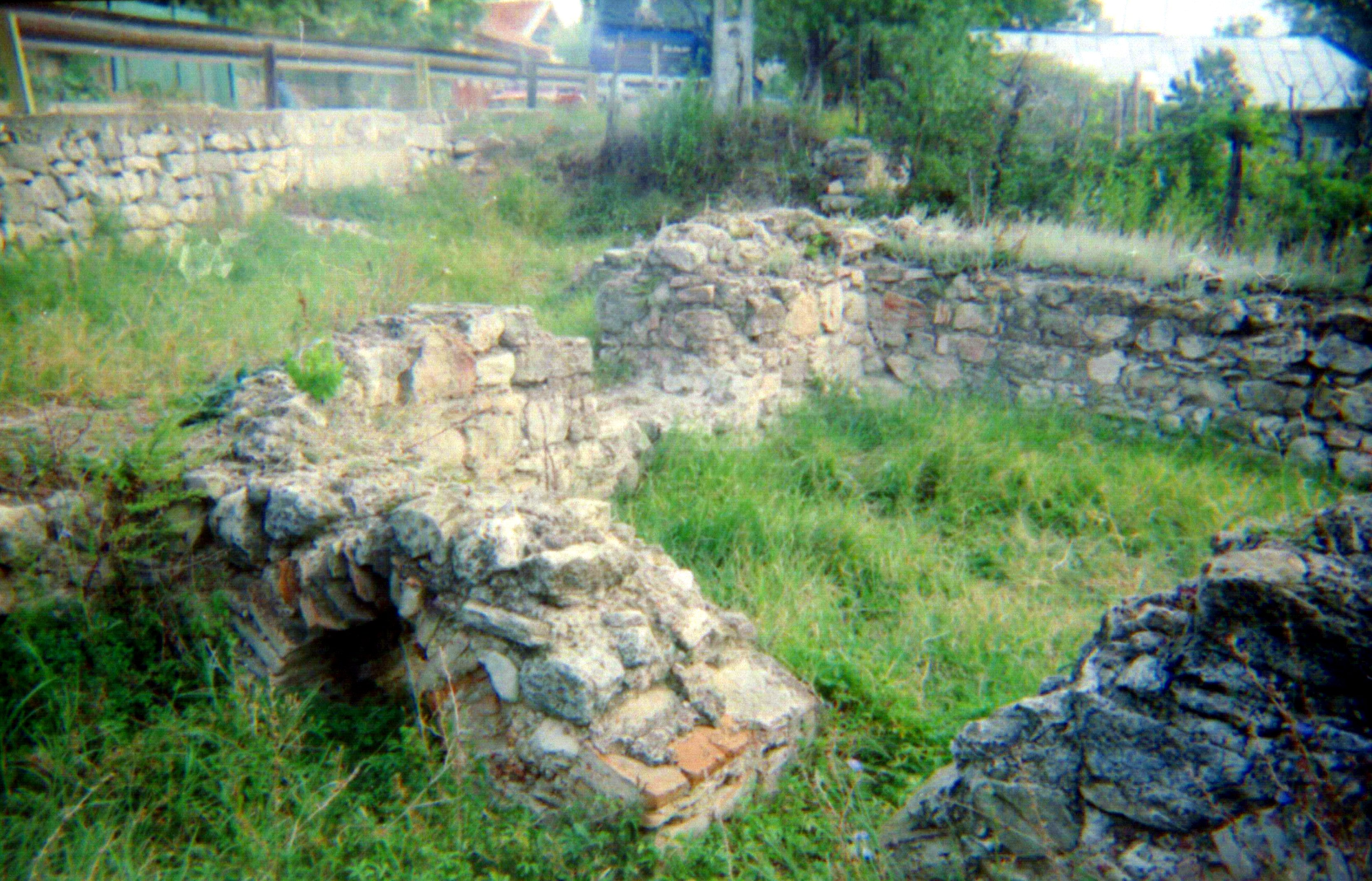

== See also ==
- List of castra
