= Pietroasele =

- Commune
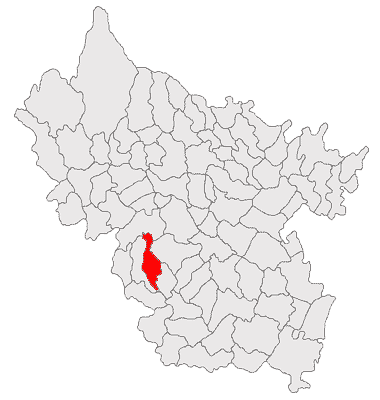
- Location in Buzău County

- Location in Romania
- Coordinates: 45°06′N 26°34′E
- Country: Romania
- County: Buzău
- Subdivisions: Câlțești, Clondiru de Sus, Dara, Pietroasa Mică, Pietroasele, Șarânga

Government
  - Mayor (2020–2024): Cornel Enache (PSD)
- Population (2021-12-01): 2,803
- Time zone: UTC+02:00 (EET)
  - Summer (DST): UTC+03:00 (EEST)
- Vehicle reg.: BZ
- Website: www.pietroasele.ro

Pietroasele is a commune in Buzău County, Muntenia, Romania, known for its vineyards. The name means "the rockies". The commune is composed of six villages: Câlțești, Clondiru de Sus, Dara, Pietroasa Mică, Pietroasele and Șarânga. It became famous with the discovery in 1837 of the Pietroasa Treasure composed of several pieces of gold and precious stones. The Romanian historian Alexandru Odobescu wrote a book on the archaeological discovery.

The village is the centre of several archaeological sites such as the Dacian fortress at Dari Gruiu. The six locations that make up the commune were built after the sixteenth century, on the lands of freeholders and lords of the neighbouring village of Bădeni, and were later divided into three municipalities: Pietroasa de Jos, Pietroasa de Sus and Șarânga, which were merged in 1968.

Although it was initially a centre for stone extraction, today viticulture is the main economic sector of the village, known for Romanian wine. The Viticulture Research Center found here is managed by the University of Agricultural Sciences in Bucharest.

== History ==
A Dacian fortress is located at 1.5 km north of Pietroasa Mică village.

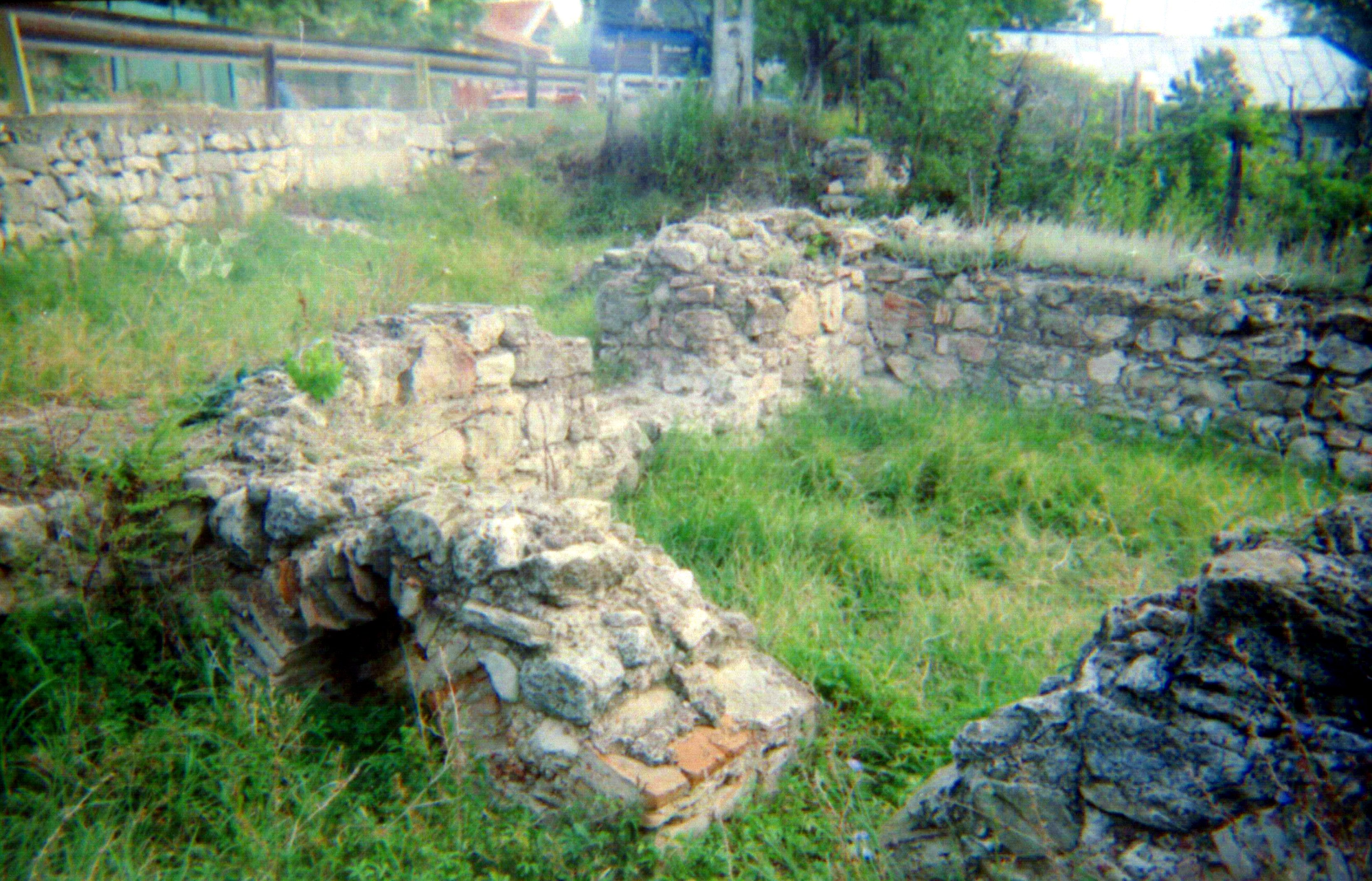
Ruins of the Roman thermae at Pietroasele near county road

A 3rd-4th century AD Roman fort and thermae was built by Constantine I when he created the Constantine Wall of the Dacian Limes probably around 330 AD. It measured 124 m x 158 m. It was situated well beyond the Danubian Limes and was connected to bridge-head forts (Sucidava, castra of Tirighina-Bărboși, and the unlocated Constantiniana Daphne) along the left bank of the Danube river.

The nearly 4000 people living in Pietroasele live mainly of agriculture and farming, but a few are employed in tourism related to the Roman discoveries and museum.

== Petroasele treasure ==
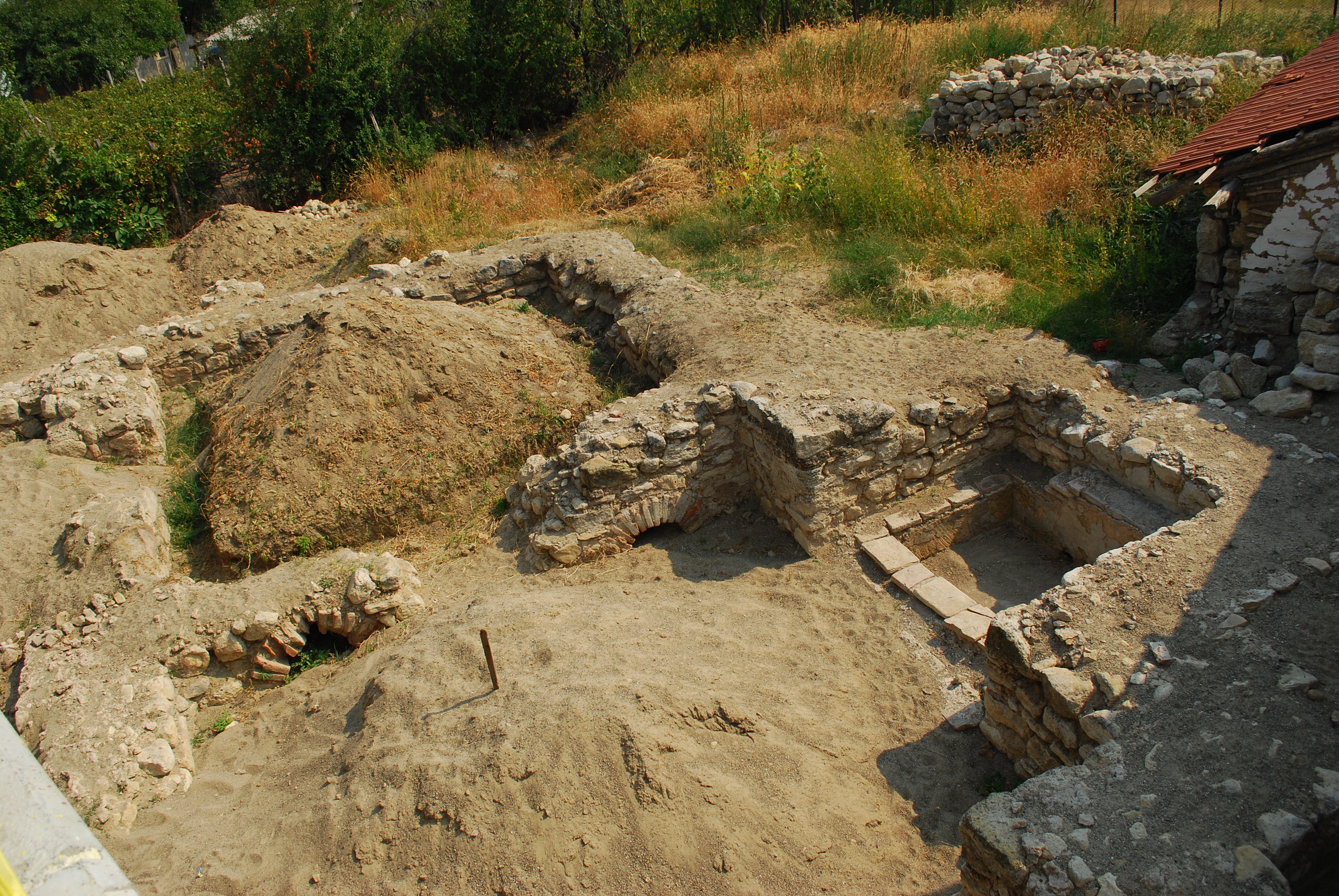
Ruins of the Roman thermae in Pietroasele.

The Pietroasele treasure, an Ostrogothic hoard uncovered in 1837 by local villagers, is on display at the National Museum of Romanian History, in Bucharest. The original gold hoard, discovered within a large ring barrow known as "Istrița hill" near Pietroasele, is a late fourth-century Gothic treasure that included some twenty-two objects of gold, among the most famous examples of the polychrome style of Migration Period art. The total weight of the find was approximately 20 kilograms (44 lb).

Of the twenty-two pieces, only twelve have survived, conserved at the National Museum of Romanian History, in Bucharest: a large eagle-headed fibula and three smaller ones encrusted with semi-precious stones; a patera, or round sacrificial dish, modelled with Orphic figures surrounding a seated three-dimensional goddess in the centre; a twelve-sided cup, a ring with a Gothic runic inscription, a large tray, two other necklaces and a pitcher.

Two of the targets are classified as monuments of architecture, both in the village of Pietroasele: a stone fountain dating from 1892 and a viticulture research station built in 1893. Three objects are considered tombstones or memorials: Crucea Frumoasă (Beautiful Cross), dating from the 19th century, Stan Avram and Ion Lemnaru (1841) from Pietroasa Minor.

Historical population
Year	Pop.	±%
2002	3,750	—
2011	3,301	−12.0%
2021	2,803	−15.1%
Source: Census data

== See also ==
- Ring of Pietroassa
- Limes Moesiae
- Roman Dacia
