= Constantine's Bridge (Danube) =

Roman bridge over the Danube (completed in 328)

- Constantine's Bridge on the map
- Coordinates: 43°45′49″N 24°27′25″E
- Crosses: Danube
- Locale: Between Sucidava (present-day Corabia, Romania) and Oescus (modern Gigen, Bulgaria)

Characteristics
- Total length: 2,437 m (7,995 ft)
- Width: 5.7 m (19 ft)
- Height: 10 m (33 ft)

History
- Construction end: 0328
- Opened: 5 July 328 AD
- Closed: mid-4th century

Statistics

UNESCO World Heritage Site
- Part of: Frontiers of the Roman Empire – Dacia
- Criteria: Cultural: ii, iii, iv
- Reference: 1718-242
- Inscription: 2024 (46th Session)

Location
- Interactive map of Constantine's Bridge

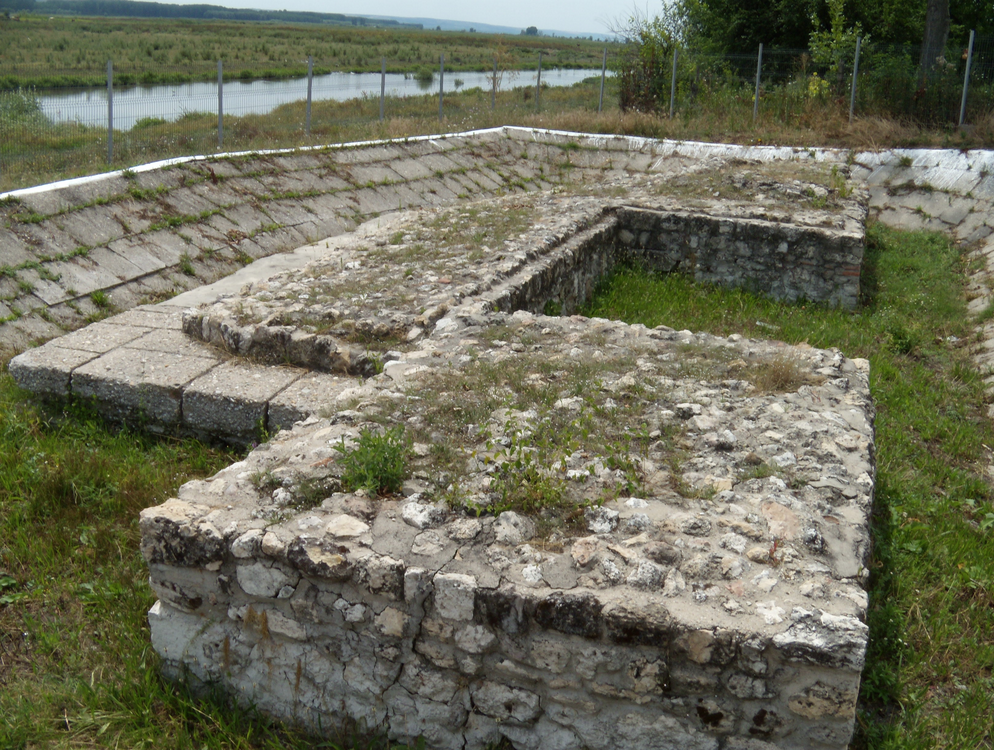
Constantine's Bridge

Constantine's Bridge (Latin: Pons per Danuvium Ductus, Bulgarian: Константинов мост, Konstantinov most; Romanian: Podul lui Constantin cel Mare) was a Roman bridge over the Danube used to reconquer Dacia. It was completed in 328 AD and remained in use for four decades.

It was officially opened on 5 July 328 AD in the presence of emperor Constantine the Great. With an overall length of 2,434 metres (7,986 ft), 1,137 metres (3,730 ft) of which spanned the Danube's riverbed, Constantine's Bridge was the longest ancient river bridge and one of the longest of all time.

== History ==
The bridge was constructed between Sucidava (present-day Corabia, Romania) and Oescus (modern Gigen, Bulgaria), during the reign of Constantine the Great, being inaugurated on 5 July 328.

The construction was certainly inspired, in technique and dimensions, by the famous Trajan's bridge, built by Apollodorus of Damascus. It is not at all excluded that the architect of this bridge was also a renowned builder, perhaps the mysterious Theophilus Patricius, proconsul, quaestor and then praefectus Urbi in the new capital of the Empire.

The inauguration of the bridge was commemorated by the minting of a gold medallion in the mint of Rome in 328, with the obvious purpose of immortalizing the great technical achievement. Today only two bronze copies of a lost original are known.

The obverse of the medallion with a diameter of 37.6 mm shows the cuirassed, draped bust of Emperor Constantine to the right; the emperor wears a diadem decorated with rosettes, and around the effigy is the legend CONSTANTI - NVS MAX AVG. On the reverse is a stone bridge with three arches and a watch tower at one end.

The bridge proved to be essential in the transfer of troops, equipment and supplies north of the Danube for the implementation of the imperial strategy north of the river. The resumption of control over the Lower Danube (ripa Gothica), included the raising of the bridge, the strengthening of the Sucidava fortress, the restoration of the strategic road towards Romula and the implantation of a new bridgehead on the left bank of the river, from where it could control the Romanian Plain - Constantiniana Daphne (still unlocated in the field).

The bridge was apparently used until the mid-4th century, the main reason for this assumption being that Valens had to cross the Danube using a bridge of boats at Constantiana Daphne during his campaign against the Goths in 367.

In any case, the decommissioning of the bridge has most likely occurred before the floods of 376, when the Goths crossed the Danube. The dramatic events in which many barbarians drown, swallowed by the waters of the Fluvius, are chronicled by Ammianus Marcellinus, without the bridge being mentioned in any way (XXXI, 4.5).

== Technical data ==
The bridge was a construction with masonry piers and wooden arch bridge and with wooden superstructure, with a length of 2,434 metres (7,986 ft) and a wooden deck with a width of 5.7 metres (19 ft) at 10 metres (33 ft) above the water. The bridge had two abutment piers at each end, serving as gates for the bridge.

== Ancient and medieval sources ==
The first mention of the bridge is from the fourth century, in Liber de Caesaribus, by Sextus Aurelius Victor. Later, it was mentioned by chronographers during the 7th - 9th centuries (Chronicon Pascale and Theophanes Confessor in Chronographia) and in the 11th century in the chronicle compiled by the Byzantine monk Georgios Kedrenos, Synopsis historion.

The construction is called "the brass bridge" by the locals on both sides of the river, as the popular belief was that its legs were cast from metal.

According to local legends, the Lord of Dew (”Domnul de Rouă”) walked on the bridge during the night, heading to the court of Emperor Ler (Ler Împărat), located in the former Roman castra from Romula.

== Research ==
The bridge was subsequently mentioned in the end of the 17th century, in the Index Geographicus Celsissimi Principatus Wallachiae, the map of Wallachia made by Romanian historian Constantin Cantacuzino. Shortly after that, the italian Anton Maria Del Chiaro, mentions the construction in the Istoria delle moderne rivoluzioni della Valachia (1718, Venice).

The construction is mentioned several times in the 18th-19th centuries by various historians or philologists, who overwhelmingly attribute it to emperor Trajan, perpetuating the erroneous information attributed to Anton Maria del Chiaro.

While Luigi Ferdinando Marsigli attempted to locate the bridge in the 17th century and Alexandru Popovici and Cezar Bolliac continued this search in the 19th century, the first real scientific discoveries were performed by Grigore Tocilescu and Pamfil Polonic in 1902. In 1934 Dumitru Tudor published the first complete work regarding the bridge, and other systematic work on the north bank of the Danube was performed in 1968 by Octavian Toropu and in 2002 by Lucian Amon and Petre Gherghe. Later, in the area was carried out a bathymetry in 2017 and a magnetometric survey in October 2022.

In summer 2026, exceptionally low water levels on the Danube due to European heatwave revealed parts of the Constantine Bridge's foundations. Seizing this rare opportunity, a team from the Pleven Regional Historical Museum used aerial photography to map and document the visible bridge remains. Researchers used this data to trace the extent of the bridge and assess its condition.

== See also ==
- List of Roman bridges
- Roman architecture
- Roman engineering
- List of crossings of the Danube
- Constantine's Wall

== Bibliography ==
- Opriș, Ioan Carol; Speriatu, Vicentiu S.; Călina, Vlad-Nicolae (2022). Pons per Danuvium ductus. Date noi despre podul lui Constantin cel Mare dintre Oescus și Sucidava/ Pons per Danuvium ductus. New data for the bridge of Constantine I between Oescus and Sucidava.
- Madgearu, Alexandru (2013). Operaţiuni militare la nord de Dunăre comandate de Constantin cel Mare, în Cruce şi misiune [Military operations north of the Danube ordered by Constantine the Great, cross and mission.] (in Romanian). Bucharest, Romania.
- Galliazzo, Vittorio (1994), I ponti romani. Catalogo generale (in Italian), vol. 2, Treviso: Edizioni Canova, pp. 319f. (No. 645), ISBN 88-85066-66-6
- Tudor, D. (1974), "Le pont de Constantin le Grand à Celei", Les ponts romains du Bas-Danube, Bibliotheca Historica Romaniae Études (in Romanian), vol. 51, Bucharest: Editura Academiei Republicii Socialiste România, pp. 135–166
