= Moesian Limes =

Collection of Roman fortifications

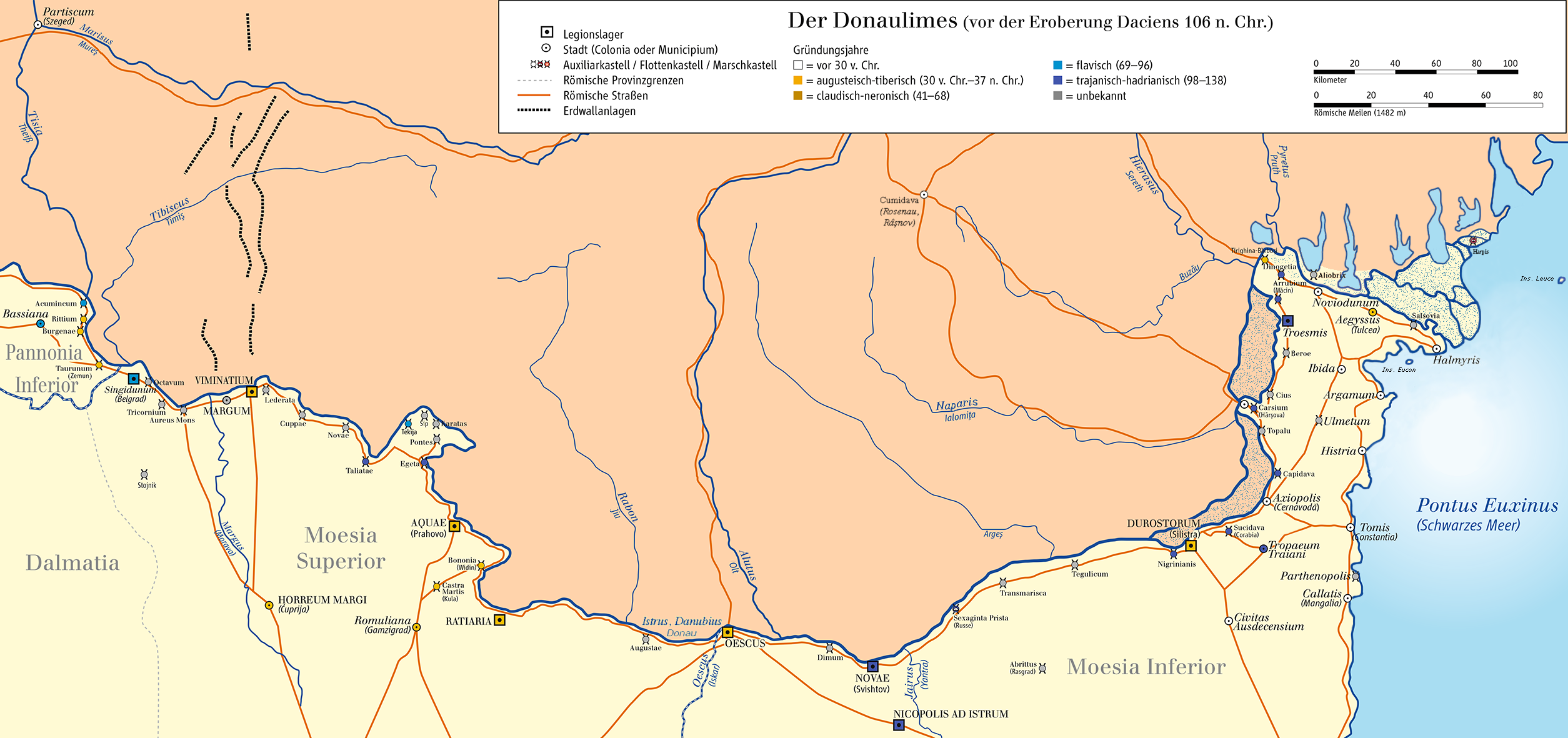
Danube Frontier system before 106 AD

The Moesian Limes (Latin: Limes Moesicus) is the modern term given to a linked series of Roman forts on the northern frontier of the Roman province of Moesia along the Danube between the Black Sea shore and Pannonia (present-day Hungary) and dating from the 1st century AD. It was the eastern section of the so-called Danubian Limes and protected the Roman provinces of Upper and Lower Moesia south of the river. The eastern section (today in Romania) is often called the limes Scythiae minoris as it was located in the late Roman province of Scythia Minor.

== Characteristics ==
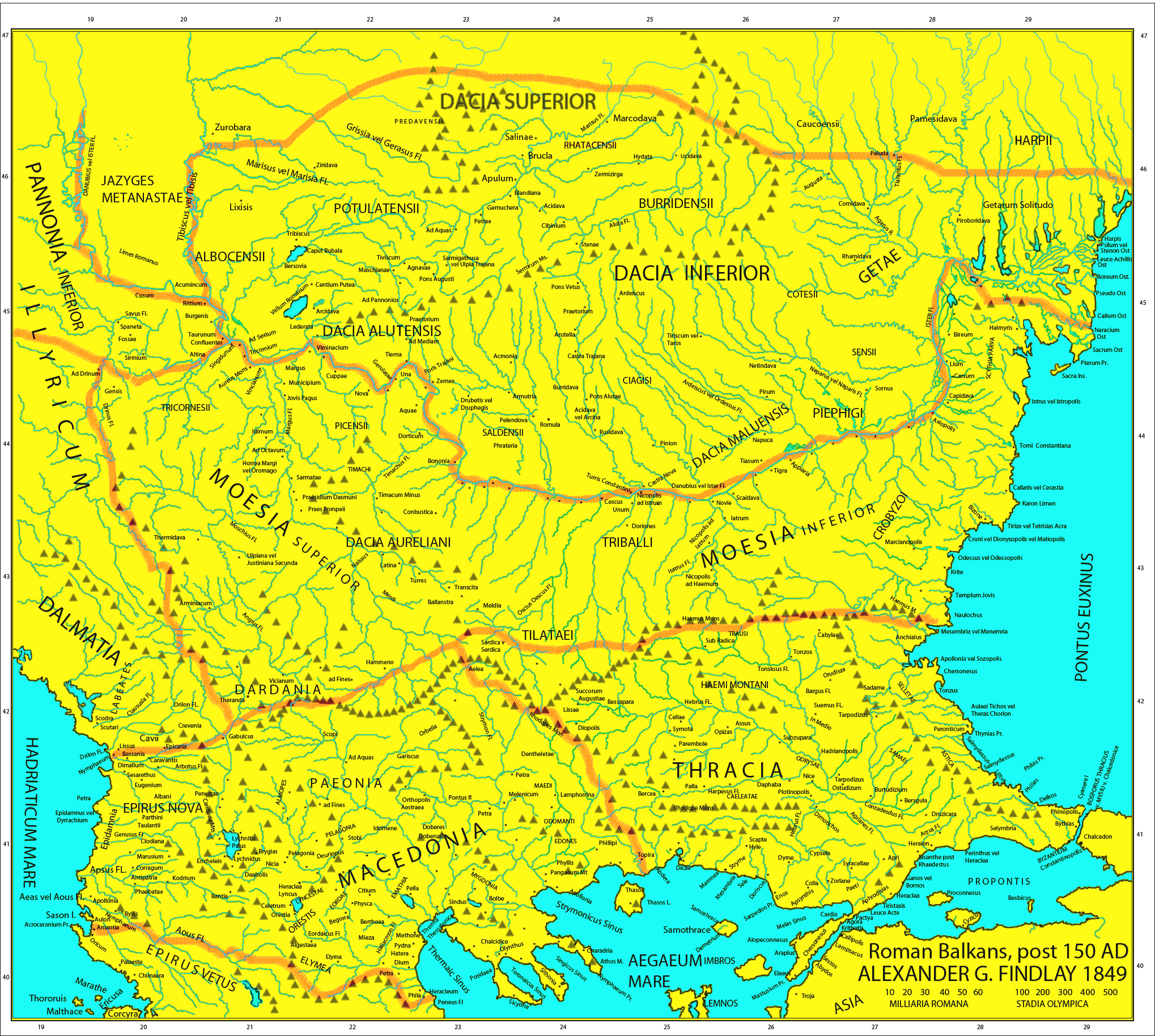
Map of Roman provinces in 150 AD

The Moesian Limes includes essentially the linked forts and stations along the Danube from Singidunum (Belgrade) to the mouth of the Danube on the Black Sea. It was not fortified with palisades or a boundary wall but the forts were linked by a road and included eight legionary fortresses, many forts for auxiliary troops and watch/signal towers. Forts along the Danube are 10 to 30 km apart and inter-visibility does not often exist.

The legionary fortresses included:

- Singidunum (Belgrade)
- Viminatium
- Aquae (Prahovo)
- Ratiaria (near the town of Artschar)
- Oescus
- Novae (near the town of Svishtov)
- Dorostorum (near the town of Silistra)
- Troesmis

Other forts on the Danube limes included:

- Augustae (near the village of Hurlets)
- Valeriana (near the village of Dolni Vadin)
- Variana (near the village of Leskowez)
- Almus (near the town of Lom)
- Regianum (near the town of Kozloduy)
- Dimum near Belene
- Nikopol
- Dorticum (Vrav)
- Sexaginta Prista (near the town of Ruse)
- Scaidava near the town of Batin
- Bononia in Vidin
- Ad mare Castrum near Koshava town

The frontier was divided into two major sections by the river Iskar at Oescus which also marked the border between the provinces of Moesia Superior and Inferior.

The gorge of the river at Djerdap formed a barrier between north-west and north-east Moesia that was difficult to overcome, initially making communication between the Pannonian and the Moesian armies difficult. This problem was solved only by the construction of a 3m-wide road under Trajan, who had the Legio VII Claudia chisel into the rock walls replacing a wooden towpath construction that was susceptible to damage by drift ice. Other improvements for shipping included the construction of a canal near Novi Sip to avoid the dangerous rapids and shoals there. The two ends of the canal were secured with forts. The best-known building on the Moesian Limes was Trajan's Bridge at Drobeta/ Turnu Severin from the early 2nd century AD, the first permanent bridge connection across the lower Danube which was also guarded on both banks by forts.

== History ==
=== Establishment ===
Moesian Limes and other linked Roman walls

Augustus was the first to advance the empire's south-eastern European border from Macedonia to the line of the Danube to increase strategic depth between the border and Italy and also to provide a major river supply route between the Roman armies in the region. The lower Danube was given priority and Marcus Licinius Crassus, proconsul of Macedonia from 29 BC, drove the Bastarnae back toward the Danube. Legion IV Scythica was initially stationed in Moesia (probably at Viminacium) to counter threats from neighbouring Thrace and aggressive peoples north of the Danube. But as a result of the Dacians constant looting that occurred whenever the Danube froze, Augustus decided to send against them some of his proven generals such as Sextus Aelius Catus and Gnaeus Cornelius Lentulus Augur (sometime between 1-11 AD). Lentulus pushed them back across the Danube and placed numerous garrisons on the right bank of the river to defend against possible and future incursions. These became the Moesian Limes. At this stage forts on the frontier consisted of earth walls with wooden palisades.

Moesia became a separate province in 6 AD. Roman military excursions across the Danube continued over 100 km to the north of the Danube delta.

The Dacians raided south of the Danube in 68/69 and at the end of 85 or the beginning of 86 AD the Dacian king Duras attacked Moesia and caught the Romans by surprise since the governor, Oppius Sabinus, and his forces were annihilated. Just before Domitian's Dacian War that followed, Domitian replaced the wood and earth walls of Danubian forts by stone walls in 87 AD (e.g. at Taliata). Accompanied by Cornelius Fuscus, Prefect of the Praetorian Guard, he personally arrived in Moesia with legions Legio IV Flavia Felix from Dalmatia, Legio I Adiutrix and Legio II Adiutrix and eventually cleared the invaders from the province.

=== Expansion beyond ===
In the winter of 98/99 AD Trajan arrived on the Danube, quartered at the Diana Fort near Kladovo, and started Dacian war preparations on the Iron Gates gorges. He extended the road in the gorge for 30 miles, as he stated on the well-known inscription of 100 AD. In 101 he also cut a canal nearby, as he also recorded on a marble plaque near Diana Fort which reads:

“because of the dangerous cataracts he diverted the river and made the whole Danube navigable”: (ob periculum cataractarum, derivato flumine, tutam Danuvii navigationem facit).

Trajan restored stone defences in the area and rebuilt all earthworks in stone. Just below the Pontes fort a large port and massive horrea were built.

Between the first and second Dacian wars, from 103 to 105, the imperial architect Apollodorus of Damascus constructed Trajan's Bridge, one of the greatest achievements in Roman architecture.

Full military occupation of the plain between the Carpathian foothills and the Danube may already have occurred by the end of Trajan’s First Dacian War (101/102). The majority of forts here, however, were established after the final conquest of the Dacian kingdom in 106 AD. However, the Romans did remove the garrisons of the Danube Limes because of the need to preserve the control of transport and trade on the danube and because troops there were a kind of strategic reserve for other fronts if needed.

The abandonment of Moldova and the creation of the Limes Transalutanus can both be tentatively dated to the reign of Hadrian.

After a long period of peace Septimius Severus reconstructed the Moesia Superior defences and under Caracalla more reconstruction was done as can be seen at Pontes where, as with many other Iron Gates forts, the original layout was supplemented with the gates and towers. A new fort was built on an island at the Porečka river.

=== Retreat to the Danube ===
The Roman abandonment of Dacia probably occurred during the reign of Gallienus (260-68), before the traditional date of around 275 when Aurelian established the new province of Dacia south of the Danube.

In the Late Roman period, the extent of control and military occupation over territory north of the Danube remains controversial. One Roman fort (Pietroasa de Jos), well beyond the Danubian Limes and near Moldavia, seems to have been occupied in the 4th century AD, as were bridge-head forts (Sucidava, Barboşi, and the unlocated Constantiniana Daphne) along the left bank of the river.

The "Brazda lui Novac de Nord" (or "Constantine Wall") has been shown by recent excavations to date from emperor Constantine around 330 AD, at the same time as the "Devil's Dykes" (or "Limes Sarmatiae"), a series of defensive earthen ramparts-and-ditches built by the Romans between Romania and the Pannonian plains.

Similarly, although considered 1st century and believed to predate the Limes Transalutanus, the function and origins of a shorter section of bank and ditch known as the "Brazda lui Novac de Sud" remain uncertain. The absence of any evidence for Late Roman forts or settlements along its course and south of it rather suggests a later, probably medieval, date.

== See also ==
- Trajan's Wall
- Limes Transalutanus
- Lower Trajan's Wall
- Tyras
- Pietroasele

== Bibliography ==
- Mócsy, András (2014) [1974]. Pannonia and Upper Moesia: A History of the Middle Danube Provinces of the Roman Empire. New York: Routledge. ISBN 978-1-317-75425-1.
- Heather, Peter. The Goths. Blackwell ed. Malden, 1998.
- Mommsen, Theodore. The Provinces of the Roman Empire. Barnes & Noble Books. New York, 1996 ISBN 0-7607-0145-8
- Wacher, J.S. The Roman world. Routledge Publisher. New York, 2002. ISBN 0-415-26314-X
