= Dacian Limes =

Collection of Roman fortifications

Roman/Byzantine/Gothic Walls, Romanian Plain

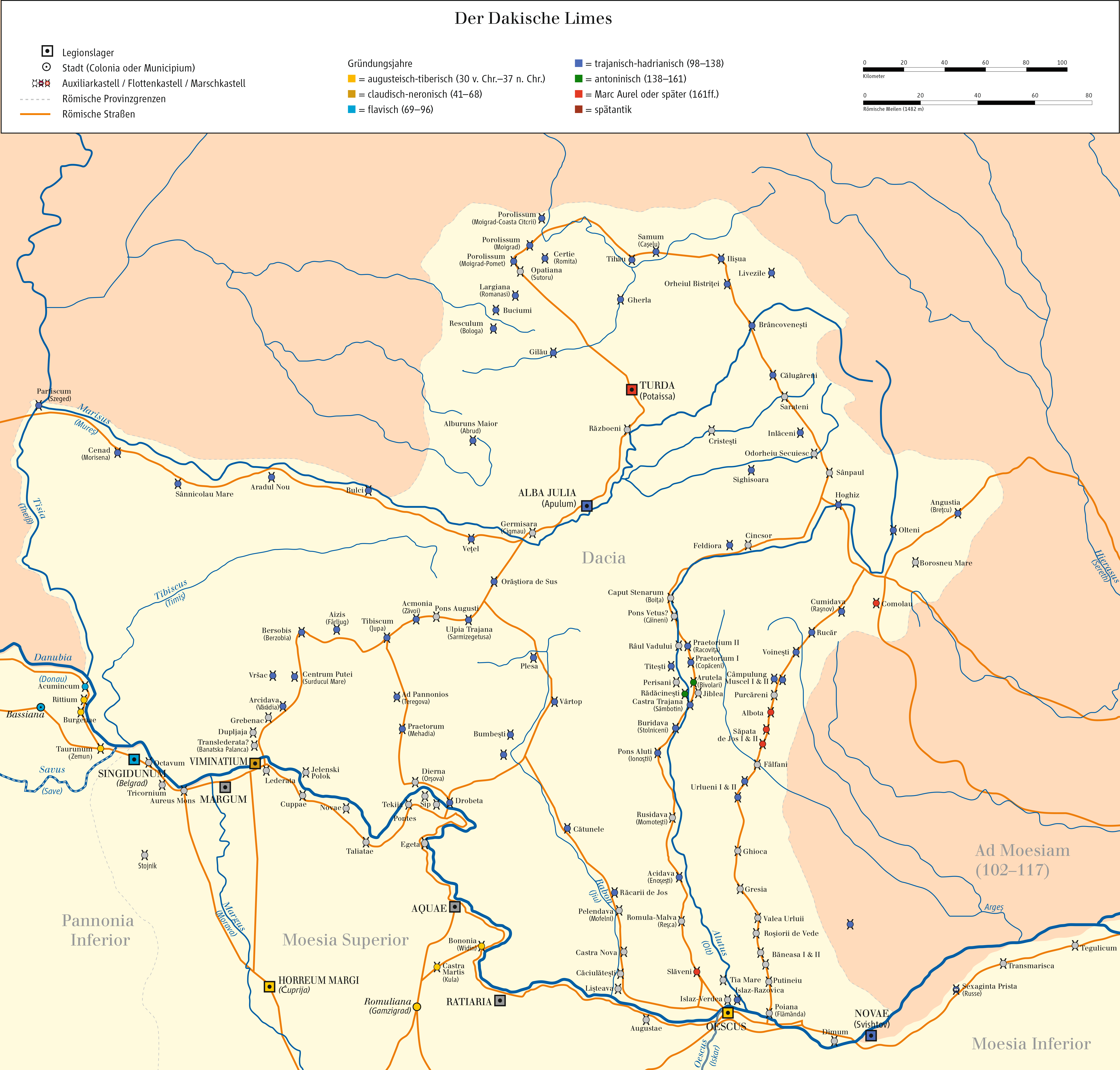
Dacian Limes with roads, forts and cities

The Dacian Limes is the generic modern term given to a collection of ramparts and linked series of Roman forts on the frontiers (see Limes (Roman Empire)) of the Roman province of Dacia dating from the early 2nd century AD. They ran for about 1,000 km and included the:

- Limes Alutanus on the eastern side of the Olt river
- Limes Porolissensis
- Limes Transalutanus in Wallachia
- so-called Trajan's Walls between Constanța and the Danube including:
  - Lower Trajan's Wall or Athanaric's Wall just north of the Danube delta in Moldova
  - Upper Trajan's Wall or Greuthungi Wall in central Moldova from the Prut to the Dniester rivers, although they may not have been Roman
- Constantine Wall, or Brazda lui Novac de Nord in Walachia from around 330 AD and 300 km long.

Many of these "walls" consisted of earth ramparts, 3 m high and 2 m wide similar to the Antonine Wall.

== Characteristics ==
The positions of the frontier in Dacia are not exactly known but are often assumed to be linked to archaeological sites, especially forts. The Dacian Limes consists of a system of watchtowers, turf walls, smallish forts lying some 5 km behind the Limes, and fortlets, as well as a few legionary fortresses behind the frontier line which were was established in several stages. The Limes was a monitoring system for control of traffic, not for real defence, and visibility from watchtowers to the outside of the province was limited.

Most of the frontier was located along the Carpathians and other mountain chains with few passes suitable for armies, and the rest by the lower courses of the Mureş, Tisza and Olt (Alutus) rivers. In addition fortifications on the north-western border of Dacia for about 6km were needed to close the access route to Porolissum. Generally the major forts of the limes were built in valleys while the nearby higher land was controlled from watch towers for example on a 42 km line south-west of Porolissum. The only other frontier in Dacia with extensive fortifications was the Limes Transalutanus in the south-east.

Defence of Dacia was centred on two points: in the eastern half on the fort at (Angustia) (Breţcu) which controlled the vulnerable Oituz Pass, and in the west on Porolissum.

== History ==
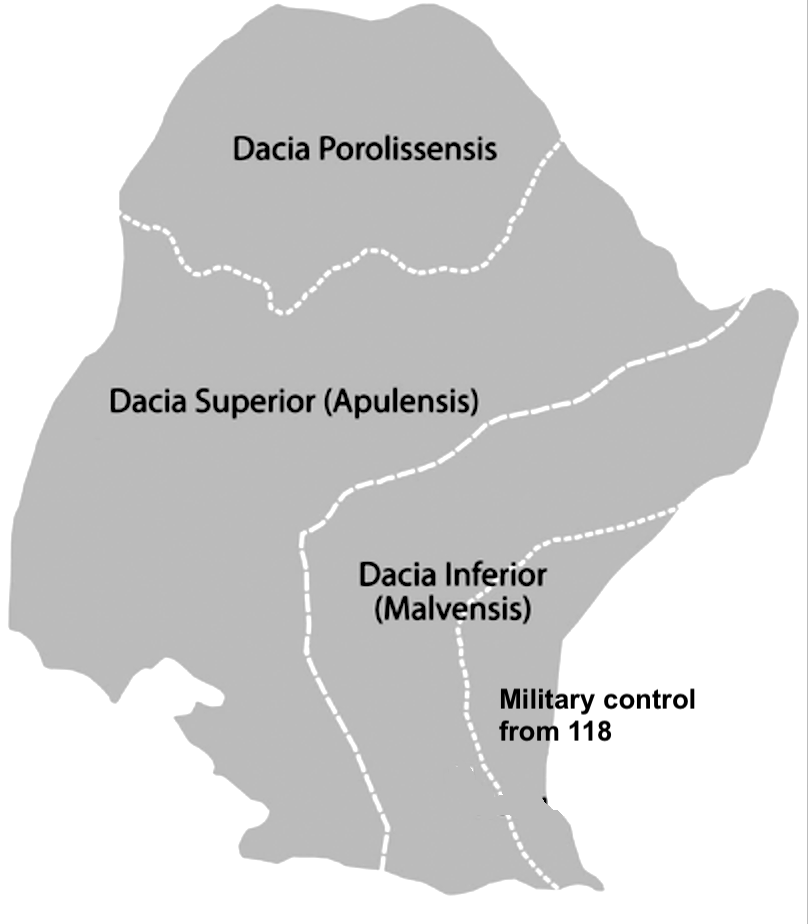
Map of Dacia in 124 AD

Dacia became a Roman province after Trajan's Dacian Wars after 106 AD, but military occupation of Wallachia, the plain between the Carpathian foothills and the Danube, may already have occurred by the end of Trajan’s First Dacian War (101/102). The majority of forts in Dacia, however, were established after the final conquest of the Dacians in 106 AD. However, the Romans did not remove the garrisons of the Danube Limes as they were needed to preserve the control of transport and trade on the Danube and because troops there were a kind of strategic reserve for other fronts if needed.

The organisation of the province proceeded quickly under its first governor, Decimus Terentius Scaurianus, as shown by coins minted in 112 bearing the inscription DACIA AUGUSTI PROVINCIA. The empire's European provinces had fortified boundaries (limes) on which military units were deployed along rivers (the Rhine and the Danube) or on defensive earthworks. Dacia's mountains and rivers were not suitable for either scheme and it took some ten years before an adequate defensive line of forts was built across the mountains, passes, and rivers on the limits of the empire. The defence of Dacia was far more costly than that of other provinces; the province had long, vulnerable, borders along many parts of which communication was difficult between the fortified posts.

The abandonment of Moldova and the creation of the Limes Transalutanus can both be tentatively dated to the reign of Hadrian.

=== Retreat to the Danube ===
Hadrian granted the southeastern part of Dacia to the Roxolani Sarmatians in 119 to appease their king, Rasparaganus, who received Roman citizenship, client king status and possibly an increased subsidy.

The Roman abandonment of all of Dacia probably occurred during the reign of Gallienus (260-68), before the traditional date of around 275 when Aurelian established the new province of Dacia south of the Danube.

In the Late Roman period, the extent of control and military occupation over territory north of the Danube remains controversial. One Roman fort (Pietroasa de Jos), well beyond the Danubian Limes and near Moldavia, seems to have been occupied in the 4th century AD, as were bridge-head forts (Sucidava, Barboşi, and the unlocated Constantiniana Daphne) along the left bank of the river.

The "Brazda lui Novac de Nord" (or "Constantine Wall") has been shown by recent excavations to date from emperor Constantine around 330 AD, at the same time as the "Devil's Dykes" (or "Limes Sarmatiae"), a series of defensive earthen ramparts-and-ditches built by the Romans between Romania and the Pannonian plains.

The Limes was used by non-Roman kingdoms after the 5th and 6th century and partially rebuilt and increased.
