= Constantine's Wall =

Constantine's Wall may refer to:

- Brazda lui Novac, in modern-day Romania
- Devil's Dykes, in modern-day Hungary
- Wall of Constantine (Constantinople), in modern-day Turkey
