= Suci =

Suci may refer to the following:

== Organizations ==
- Suci (tribe), an ancient Dacian tribe
- Socialist Unity Centre of India (SUCI), a communist party in India

== People ==
- Suci Rizky Andini, and Indonesian badminton player
- Bob Suci, an American football player
