= Dalmatius =

Caesar of the Roman Empire from 335 to 337

- Caesar of the Roman Empire
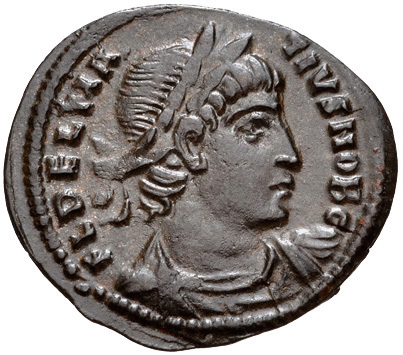
- Follis of Dalmatius minted in Aquileia. Legend: fl delmativs nob c.
- Caesar: 18 September 335 – c. 337
- Born: c. 315
- Died: c. 337
Names
- Flavius Julius Dalmatius
- Dynasty: Constantinian
- Father: Flavius Dalmatius

Flavius Julius Dalmatius, sometimes spelled Delmatius (c. 315 – c. 337) was caesar of the Roman Empire from 335 to 337, under Emperor Constantine the Great. He oversaw Thrace, Macedonia, and Achaea.

The son of Constantine's half-brother Flavius Dalmatius, Dalmatius was educated by Bishop Exuperius while his family was in exile in Toulouse and by the poet Aemilius Magnus Arborius in Constantinople. His family came to Constantinople in the 330s and Dalmatius was raised to be the fourth caesar under Constantine, alongside Constantine II, Constans I, and Constantius II. Dalmatius was murdered by his soldiers during a massacre of the male members of the Constantinian dynasty after the death of Constantine. His territory was divided between Constantius II and Constans I.

== Early life ==
Flavius Julius Dalmatius, more commonly spelled Delmatius on coinage, was born in an uncertain year. His birth year has been hypothesized to be c. 315. Dalmatius was the son of Flavius Dalmatius, who was the son of Constantius Chlorus and Flavia Maximiana Theodora. Constantine the Great was the uncle of Dalmatius. Constantius Chlorus might have named Flavius Dalmatius after the province of Dalmatia, which he once governed.

Flavius Dalmatius, having been born to a sitting emperor unlike Constantine, was a threat to Constantine and lived in exile in Toulouse until the later portion of Constantine's reign when he was made consul in 333, and administrator in Antioch. In Narbo or Toulouse, Dalmatius and his brother Hannibalianus were educated by Bishop of Toulouse Exuperius. After coming to Constantinople the brothers were educated by the poet Aemilius Magnus Arborius.

== Caesar ==
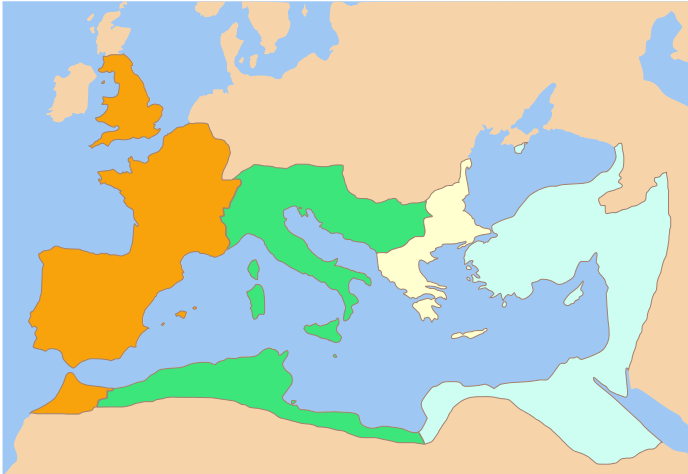
Division of the Empire among the caesares appointed by Constantine the Great. Dalmatius was given control over the buff-yellow central area including Greece and the Balkans.

Constantine II, Constans I, and Constantius II were raised to the rank of caesar, the princes and heirs, by Constantine in 317, 324, and 333 respectively. Constantine raised Dalmatius to the rank of caesar in Ripa Gothica on 18 September 335, and gave him control of Thrace, Macedonia, and Achaea. This date coincided with the eleventh anniversary of Constantine's victory at the Battle of Chrysopolis. At the same time as Dalmatius' appointment, Hannibalianus was made rex regum et gentium ponticarum (King of Kings and of the Pontic Races), which would give him some authority over the Kingdom of Armenia and eastern Anatolia. Dalmatius' appointment as caesar may have been part of an attempt by Constantine to restore the Tetrarchy system where four people ruled over the empire.

As caesar Dalmatius was in charge of an army near the Danube and used Naissus as his base. Naissus was a central hub in the Balkans and Constantine used it as his base for campaigns against the Sarmatians and Limigantes in 334, and was later used by Emperor Julian during his campaign against Constantius II in 361. Fortissimus, a honorific meaning "most courageous", was given to Dalmatius; Constantius II was the only other caesar to receive this title. Evidence that Dalmatius might have participated in Constantine's campaigns in Dacia is provided by a coin bearing his name which features a prince holding the legionary standard and triangular dagger (parazonium) while two prisoners of war lie at his feet.

Coinage in the name of Dalmatius was produced in Trier, Lyons, Arles, Rome, Siscia, Thessalonica, Heraclea, Constantinople, Nicomedia, Cyzicus, Alexandria, and Antioch. Dalmatius and his fellow caesares were included in all imperial laws as superscription, but were removed by the compilers of the 5th century compilation of laws Codex Theodosianus, who only included the name of Constantine. The chronicler Theophanes the Confessor claimed that Dalmatius and his soldiers saved patriarch of Alexandria Athanasius of Alexandria from being murdered at the First Synod of Tyre in 335, but other historians believe that Theophanes mistook Dalmatius for his father, who was present in Antioch, and the event most likely occurred before Dalmatius was made caesar.

The historian T. D. Barnes believed that Valerius Maximus was the praetorian prefect for Dalmatius due to a rescript featuring his name being removed in 337, but other historians believe that the praetorian prefect removed from this rescript was Valerius Felix and that it was done in 355/356. Flavius Dalmatius might have served as Dalmatius' praetorian prefect, similarly to how Gaius Furius Sabinius Aquila Timesitheus served as the praetorian prefect for his son-in-law Emperor Gordian III.

== Death ==
Dalmatius was murdered after the death of Constantine on 22 May 337, but before 9 September; Jerome wrote that Dalmatius was killed in 338, but this is unlikely as the new augusti were declared on 9 September 337. Hannibalianus and Flavius Dalmatius were killed as well. Their deaths occurred in the midst of a massacre of the Constantinian family that killed all of the male members of the family except for Constantine II, Constans I, Constantius II, Constantius Gallus and Julian. The territory assigned to Dalmatius was divided between Constantius II and Constans I.

The 4th-century historian Aurelius Victor was uncertain about the manner of Dalmatius' death and who was responsible. The accounts of historians Zosimus, Jerome, and Eunapius reported that Dalmatius was killed by his soldiers with the support of Constantius II. These versions may themselves derive from a reconstructed historical text, known as the Enmannsche Kaisergeschichte, posited to have been a common source for all of these historians. If the Enmannsche Kaisergeschichte existed, the relevant sections were probably written around 358.

== Works cited ==
=== Books ===
- Baker-Brian, Nicholas; Tougher, Shaun, eds. (2020). The Sons of Constantine, AD 337-361: In the Shadows of Constantine and Julian. Palgrave Macmillan. ISBN 978-3-030-39898-9.
- Bowman, Alan; Cameron, Averil; Garnsey, Peter, eds. (2008). The Cambridge Ancient History: The Crisis of Empire, AD 193–337. Vol. 12 (2 ed.). Cambridge University Press. ISBN 9781139053921.
- Jones, A.; Martindale, J.; Morris, J., eds. (1971). The Prosopography of the Later Roman Empire. Vol. 1. Cambridge University Press. ISBN 0521072336.
- Lenski, Noel, ed. (2007). The Cambridge Companion to the Age of Constantine. Cambridge University Press. ISBN 9781139000840.
- Lewis, William (2024). Division of Empire: The Reign of the Sons of Constantine. Oxford University Press. ISBN 9780197745175.
- Mattingly, Harold, ed. (1972). The Roman Imperial Coinage. Vol. 7. Spink & Son.
- Van Dam, Raymond (2012). The Roman Revolution of Constantine. Cambridge University Press. ISBN 9780511819476.

=== Journals ===
- Blockley, R. (1972). "Constantius Gallus and Julian as Caesars of Constantius II". Latomus. 31 (2). Société d'Études Latines de Bruxelles: 433–468. doi:10.2307/41503809. JSTOR 41503809.
- Burgess, R. (2008). "The Summer of Blood: The "Great Massacre" of 337 and the Promotion of the Sons of Constantine". Dumbarton Oaks Papers. 62. Dumbarton Oaks: 5–51. doi:10.2307/20788042. JSTOR 20788042.
- Di Maio, Michael; Arnold, Duane; Arnold, Fr. (1992). "Per Vim, Per Caedem, Per Bellum: A Study of Murder and Ecclesiastical Politics in the Year 337 A.D.". Byzantion. 62. Peeters Publishers: 158–211. doi:10.2307/44171626. JSTOR 44171626.
- Marcos, Moysés (2014). "Constantine, Dalmatius Caesar, and the Summer of A.D. 337". Latomus. 73 (3). Société d'Études Latines de Bruxelles: 748–774. doi:10.2307/24858587. JSTOR 24858587.
- Marcos, Moysés (2019). "Notes and Discussions/Discussion: Some Reflections on Constantine, Dalmatius Caesar, and CI 5.17.7". Phoenix. 73 (1). Johns Hopkins University Press: 184–189. doi:10.1353/phx.2019.0049.
- Woods, David (2011). "Numismatic Evidence and the Succession to Constantine I". The Numismatic Chronicle. 171. Royal Numismatic Society: 187–196. doi:10.2307/42667233. JSTOR 42667233.
