= Scaidava =

Dacian town, now located in modern-day Bulgaria

Scaidava (Ancient Greek: Σκεδεβά) was a Dacian town between Iatrus and Trimammium (Ablanovo) near the village of Batin, Bulgaria.

It was later an ancient Roman fort along the empire's border, forming part of the limes Moesiae defences along the Danube.

== See also ==
- Dacian davae
- List of ancient cities in Thrace and Dacia
- Dacia
- Roman Dacia
