= Diana Fort =

Archaeological site in Serbia

Diana Fortress
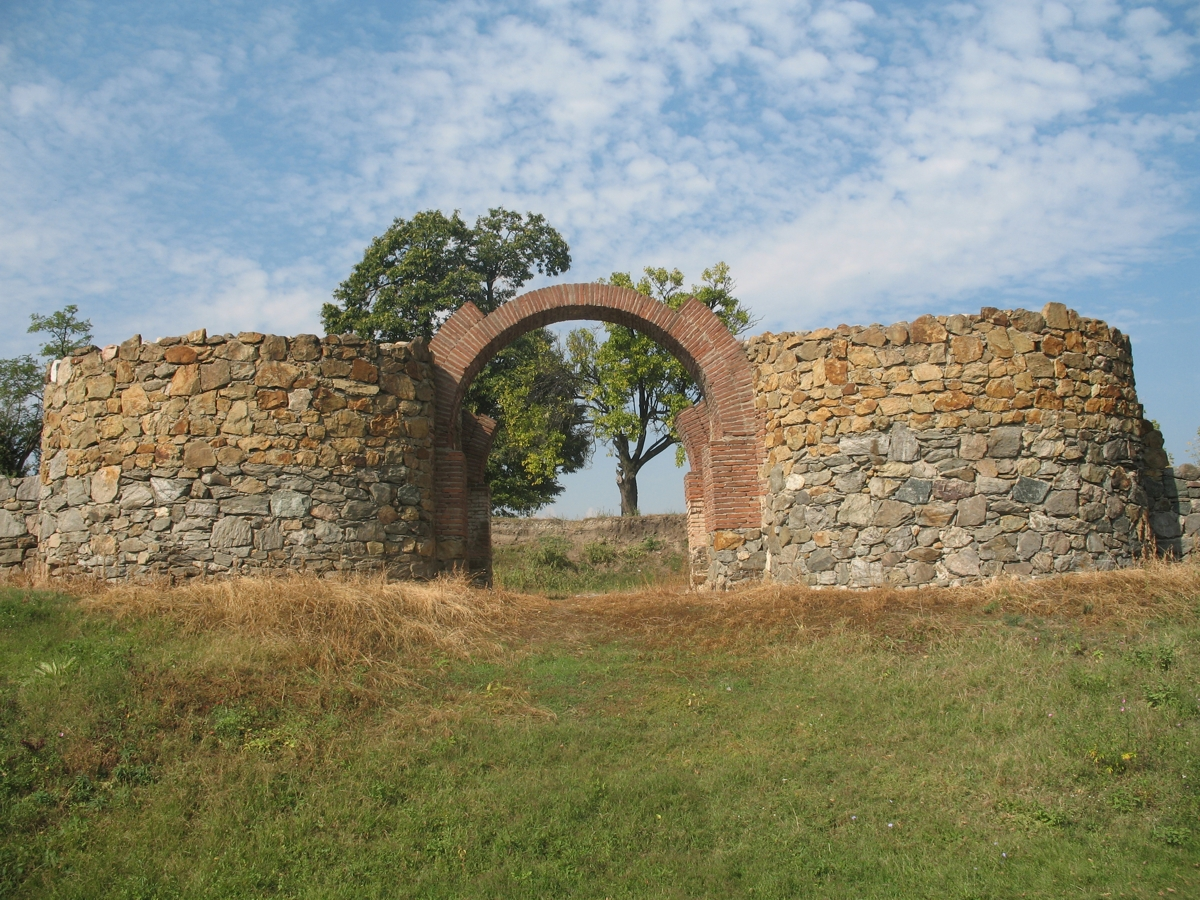
- Diana Fortress east gate

- Location within Serbia

General information
- Architectural style: Fortification, mixed
- Location: Karataš, Kladovo Municipality, Serbia
- Coordinates: 44°39′13″N 22°32′38″E
- Completed: 101AD. Modifications ~275-325AD; Rebuilt 530AD
- Demolished: ~350AD

Design and construction
- Designations: Archaeological Sites of Exceptional Importance

Diana Fort (Serbian: Тврђава Диана, romanized: Tvrđava Diana) is a Roman fort located near the hamlet of Karataš, 8 km northwest of Kladovo, in eastern Serbia in the Karataš archaeological site. It is located on cliffs of the Đerdap, above the Danube, on a strategic location overlooking the Danube frontier. It has been extensively excavated, is one of the best explored forts of the Moesian Limes, and can be visited today.

It was built in the Tiberian-Claudian age as part of the Roman Moesian Limes frontier system of linked forts along the Danube. After its destruction during Domitian's Dacian War, it was rebuilt in 100 AD during preparation for Trajan's Dacian Wars with a larger area of 1.7 ha (compared to the earlier 1.04 ha) and with the main buildings in stone. It then became also known as Statio Cataractarum Dianae (Diana Cataracts Station) as it protected the entrance to the canal dug in preparation for the wars to avoid cataracts in the main river course. The canal was more than 3 km long and 40 m wide, an achievement celebrated on the Imperial Tablet found near the fort.

The fort measured 172 x 100 m and had semicircular towers. 150 m west of it was a civilian settlement, and on the eastern side an ancient cemetery; an aqueduct has also been discovered.

Modifications were made at the end of the 3rd and beginning of the 4th century when additional towers were added towards the river for extra defence towards the Danube shores. In the mid 4th century the fort was damaged by the invading Huns and in 530 AD rebuilt by Emperor Justinian.

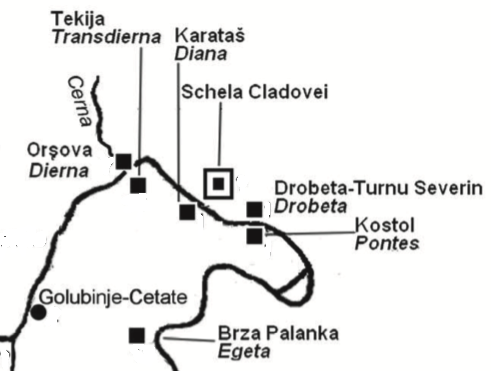
Forts on the Danube near Drobeta

== Garrison ==
The garrisons included detachments of Roman Moesian legions (V Macedonica, VII Claudia, IIII Flavia, XIII Gemina), as well as auxiliaries: Cohors VI Thracum and Cohors V Gallorum.

== Finds & Recognitions ==
The Imperial Tablet, an inscribed marble slab (97 X 209 X 20 cm) was found in 1969 150 m south-east of the Diana fort near the eastern edge of the Roman cemetery. It commemorated Trajan’s canal at the Iron Gate, dug in AD 101:

The Emperor Caesar Trajan Augustus, son of the deified Nerva, victor over the Germans, chief priest, holder of the tribunician power five times, father of his country, consul for the fourth time, had the navigation along the Danube, dangerous because of the rapids, made safe by having dug a new channel.

Besides the military buildings, a sacrificial necropolis and civilian settlement is located within the walls. Items such as various daily tools, marble and bronze sculptures were found.

In 1983, Diana fort was added to the Archaeological Sites of Exceptional Importance (Serbia) list by the Republic of Serbia.

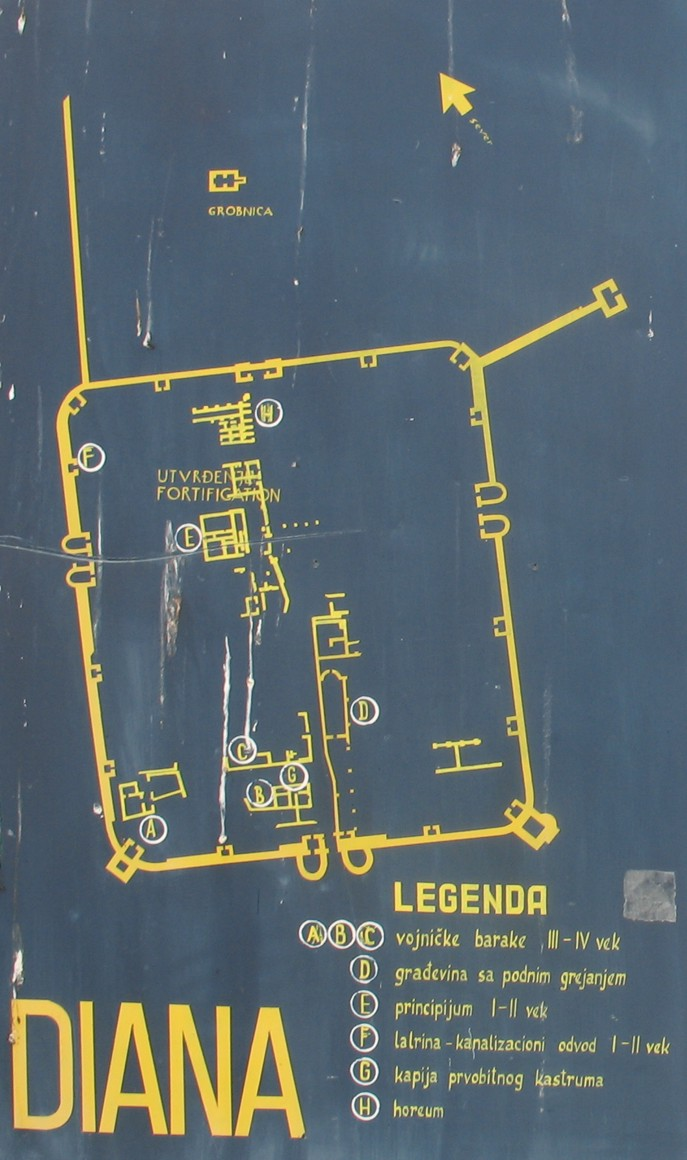
Plan

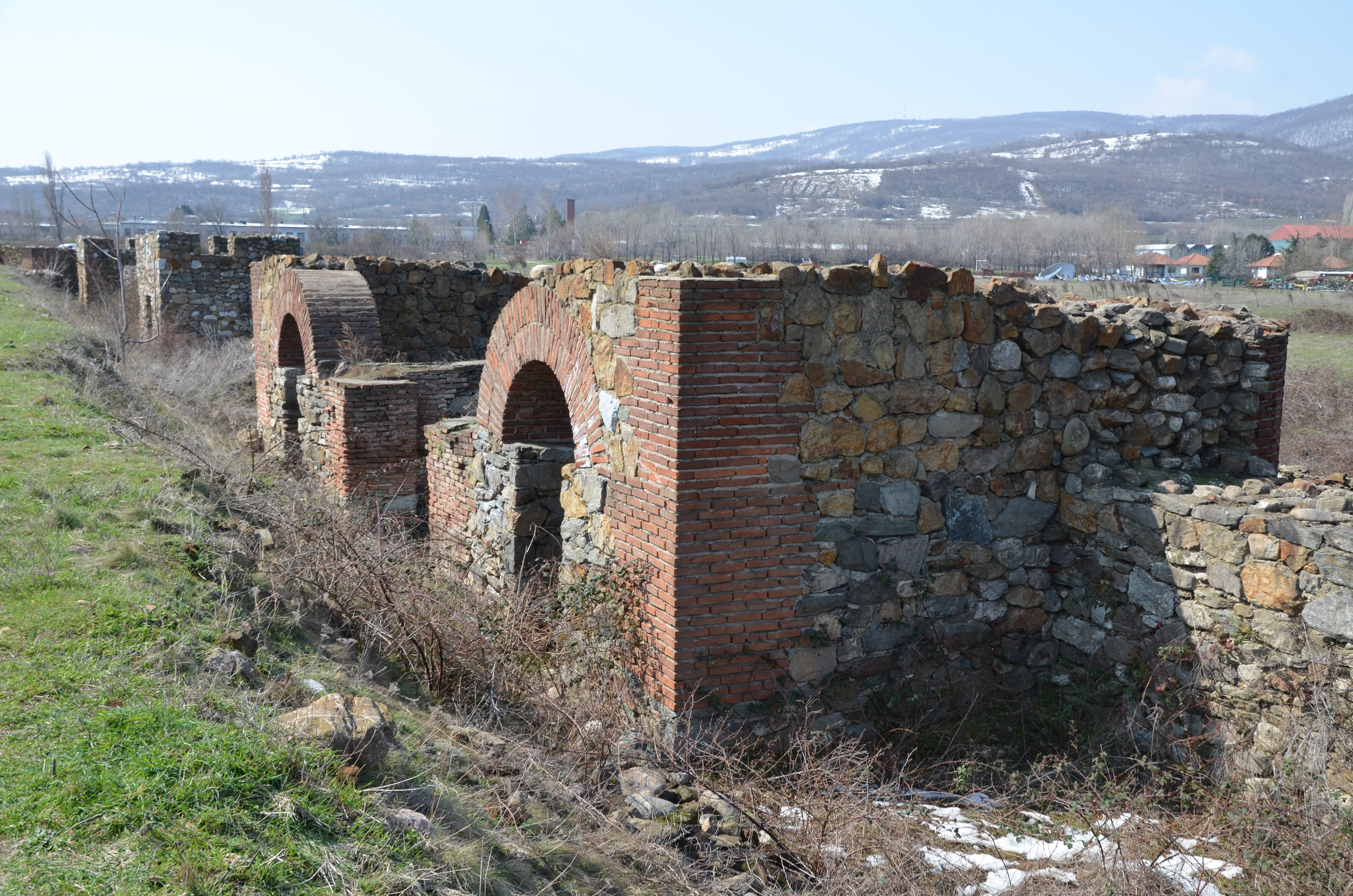

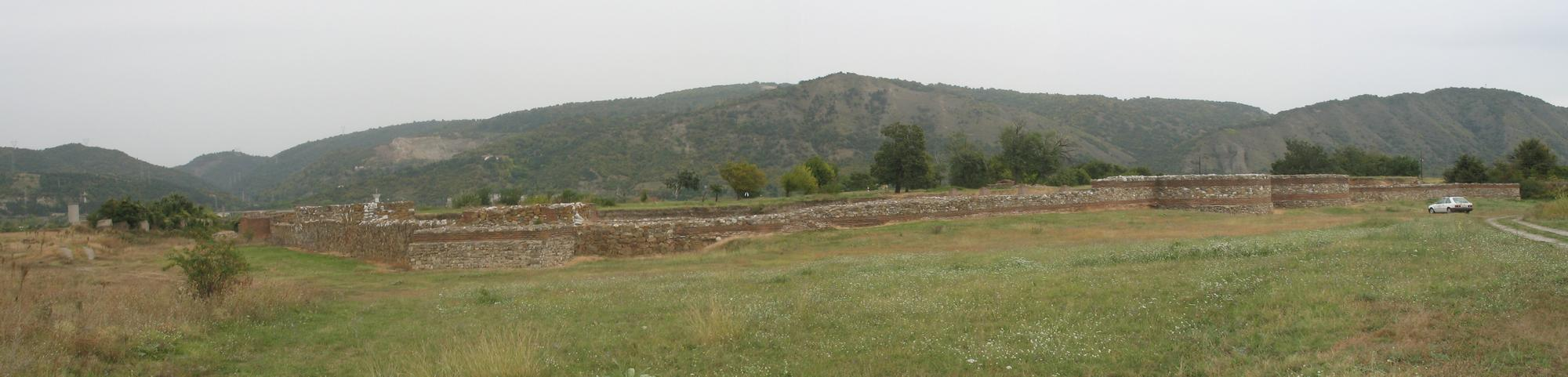
Panorama of Diana fortress

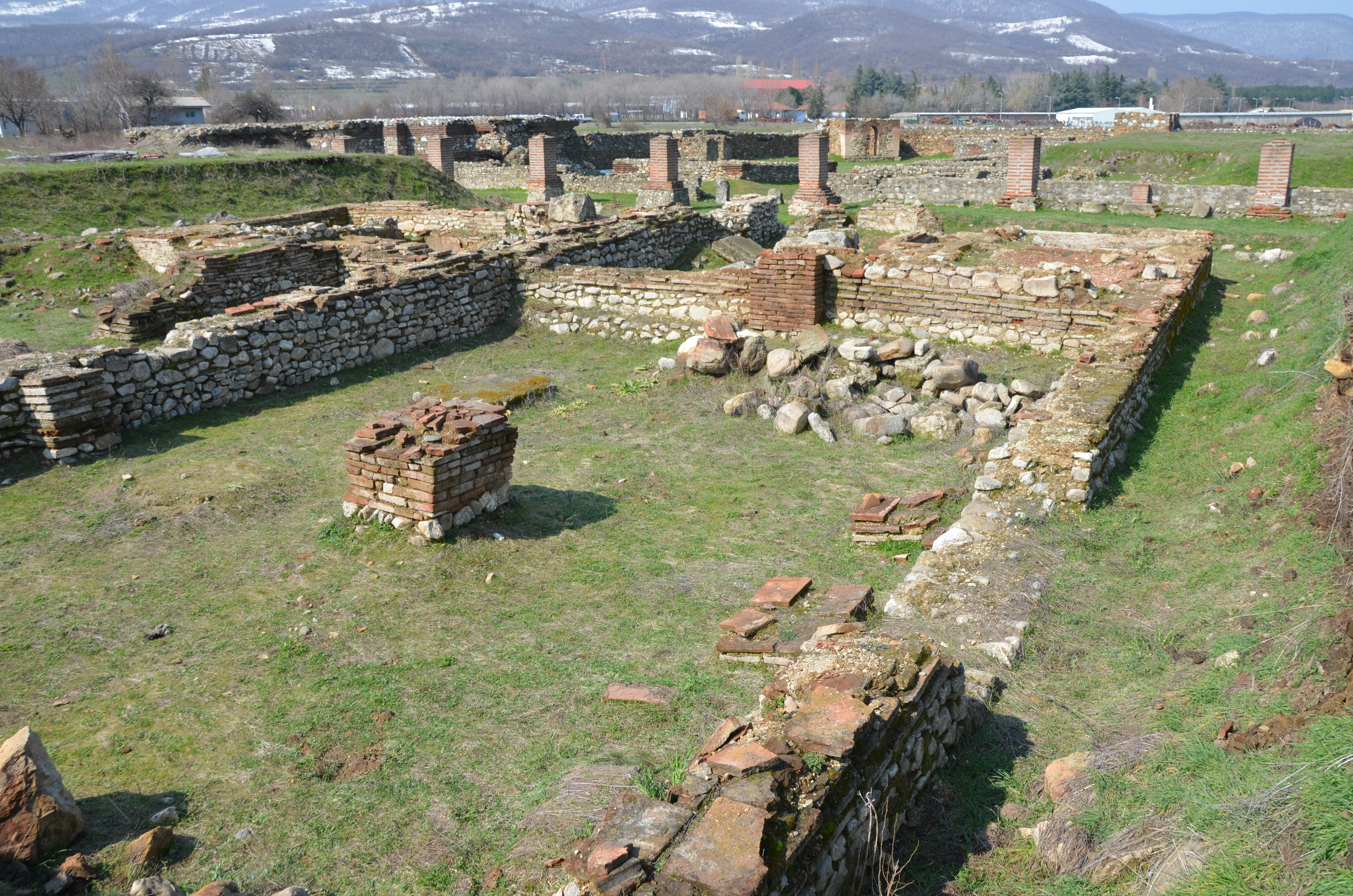

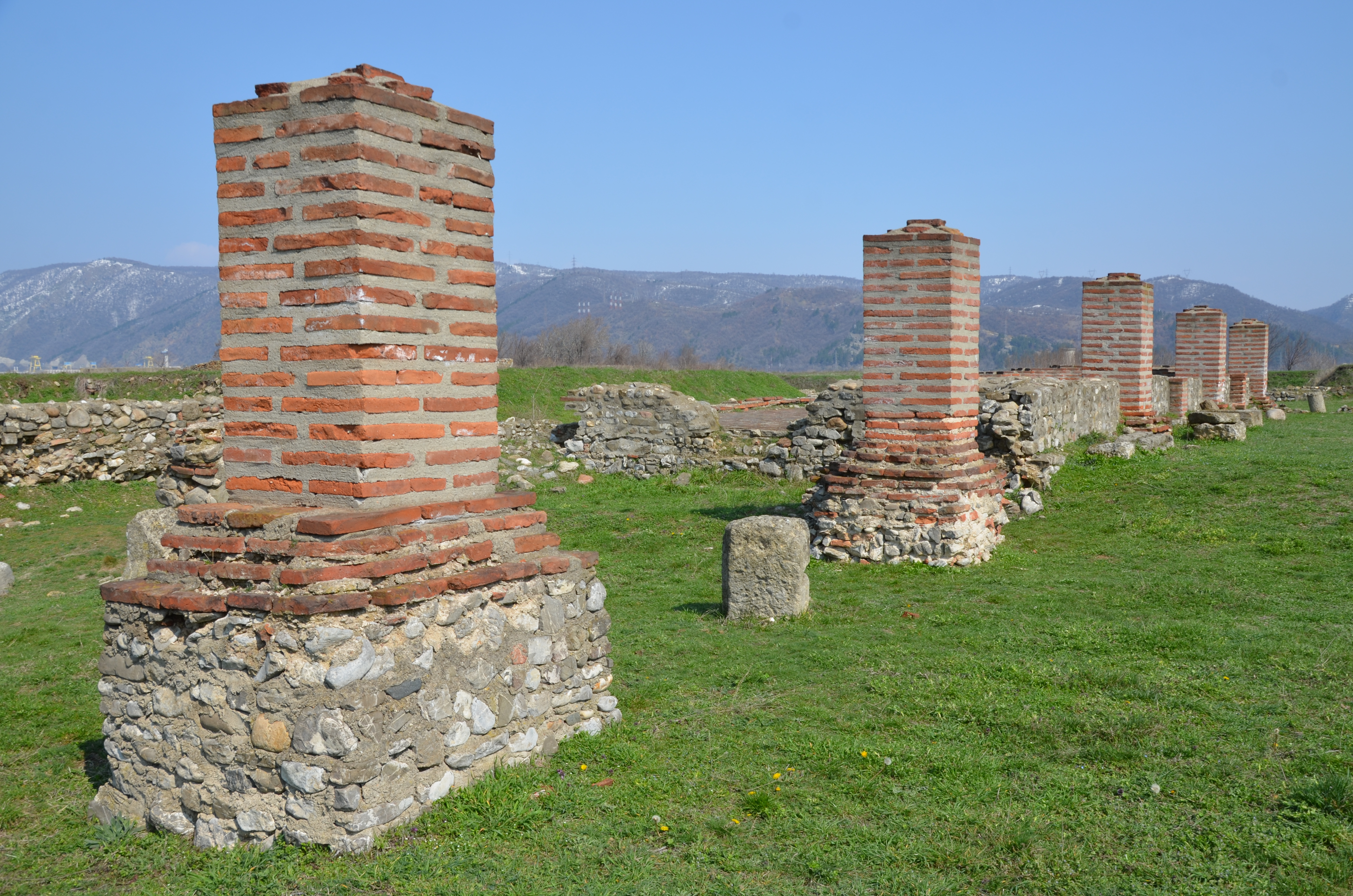

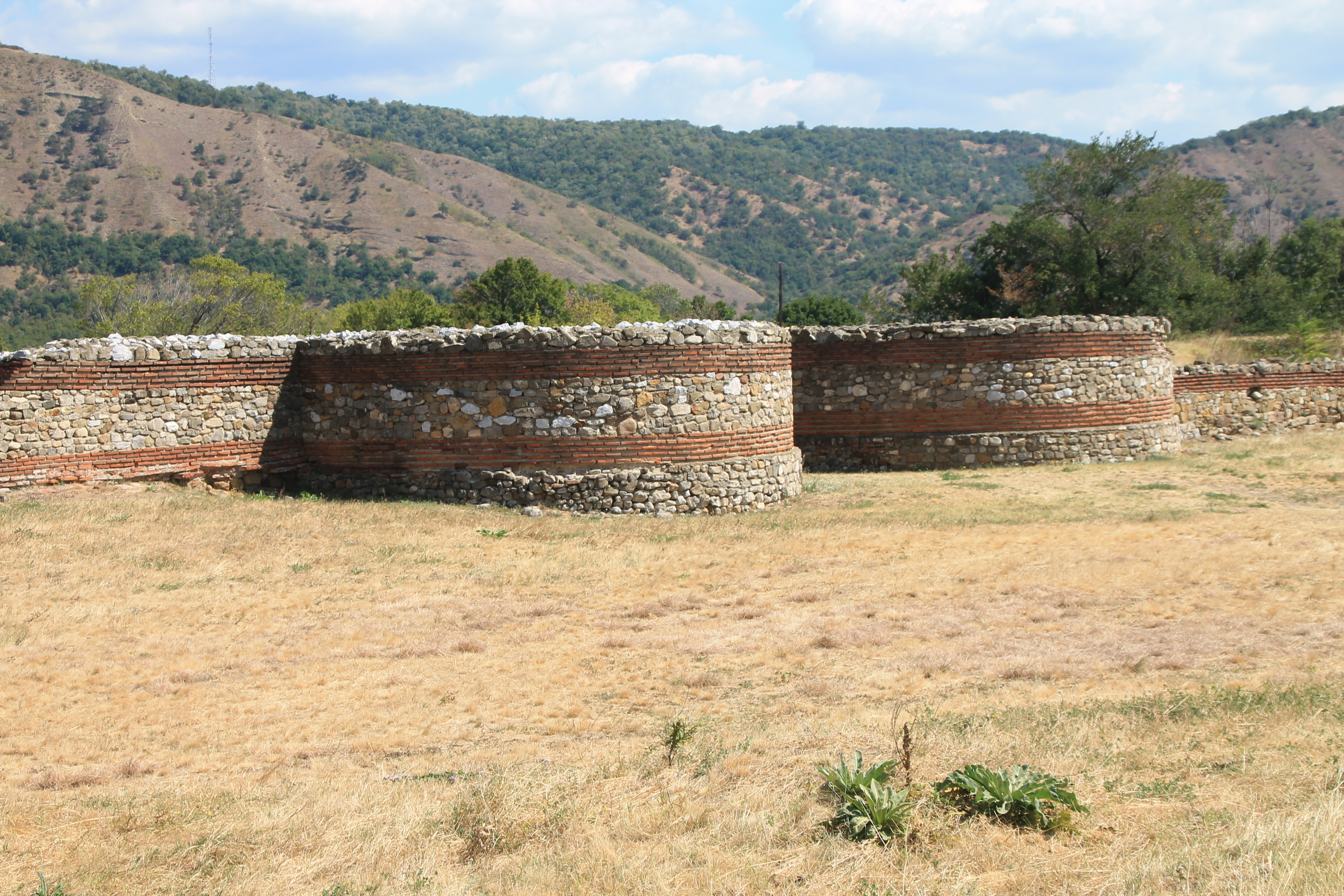

== See also ==
- Archaeological Sites of Exceptional Importance
