= Dacian fortress of Pietroasa Mică =

- Dacian fortress from "Gruiul Dării"
- Location within Romania
- 45.1169°N 26.5777°E
- Location: Gruiul Dării, Pietroasa Mică, Buzău, Romania

Site notes
- Elevation: 530 m (1,740 ft)
- Condition: Ruined

Monument istoric
- Reference no.: BZ-I-m-A-02212.01

The Dacian fortress of Pietroasa Mică was a Dacian fortified town.
