= Pontes fort =

Roman fort on River Danube

Coordinates: 44°36′47″N 22°40′09″E

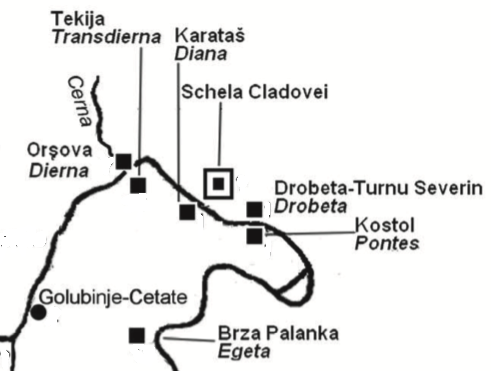
Forts on the Danube near Drobeta

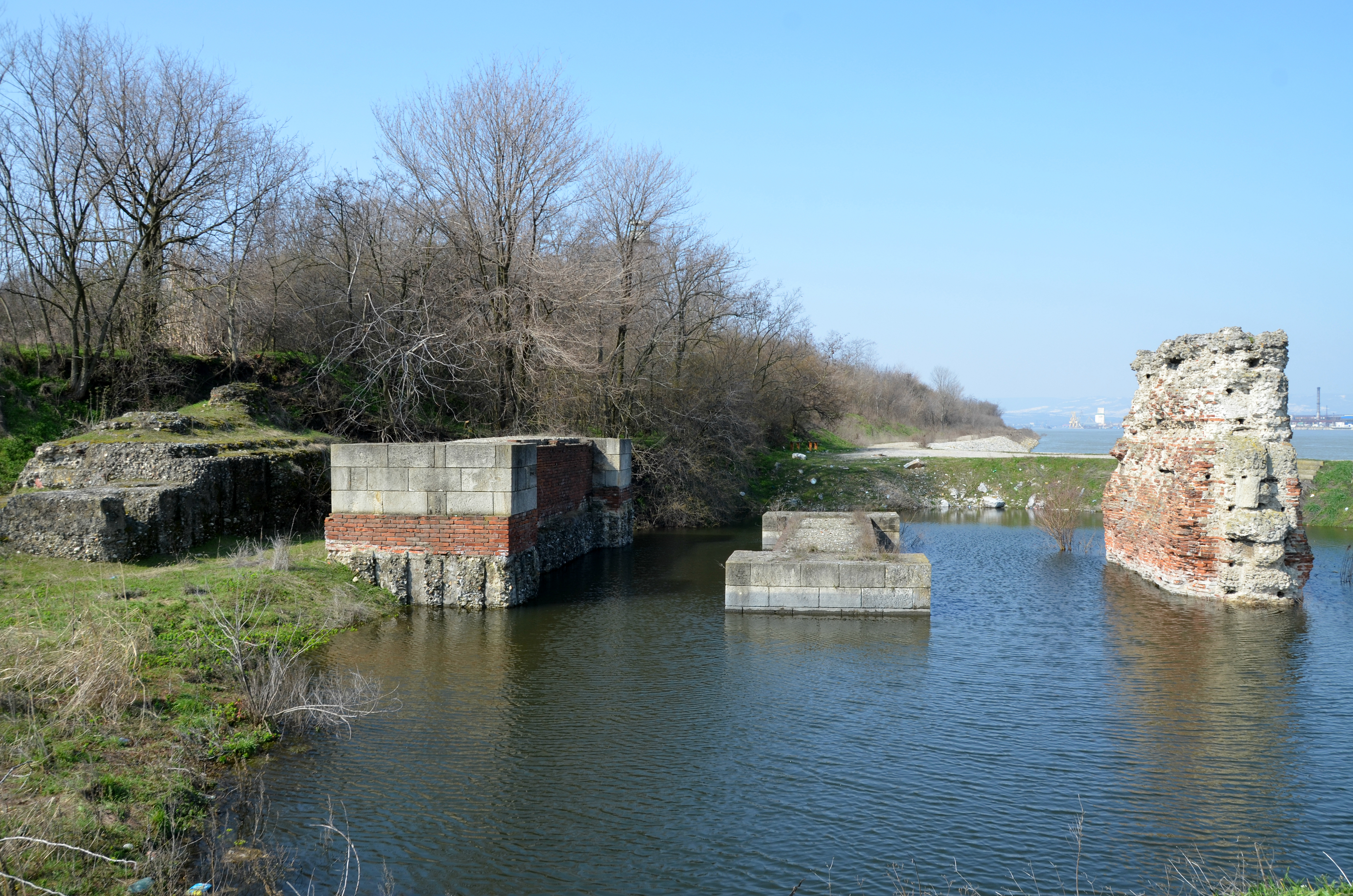
Remains of the Trajan's Bridge on the right bank of Danube

Pontes fort was an ancient Roman fort situated on the river Danube in the Roman province of Moesia and forming a key part of the Limes Moesiae frontier system. It is near the modern town of Kladovo, Serbia. It was built in about 103-105 AD and is one of the most important Roman sites along the Danube as it protected the southern end of the strategic Trajan's Bridge over the river.

It has been excavated and is now protected in an archaeological park.

A bronze head of Emperor Trajan's father, or Trajan himself. was found in the 19th century by fishermen in the river Danube near a pillar of the bridge, part of a statue at the bridge entrance and now in the museum of Belgrade.

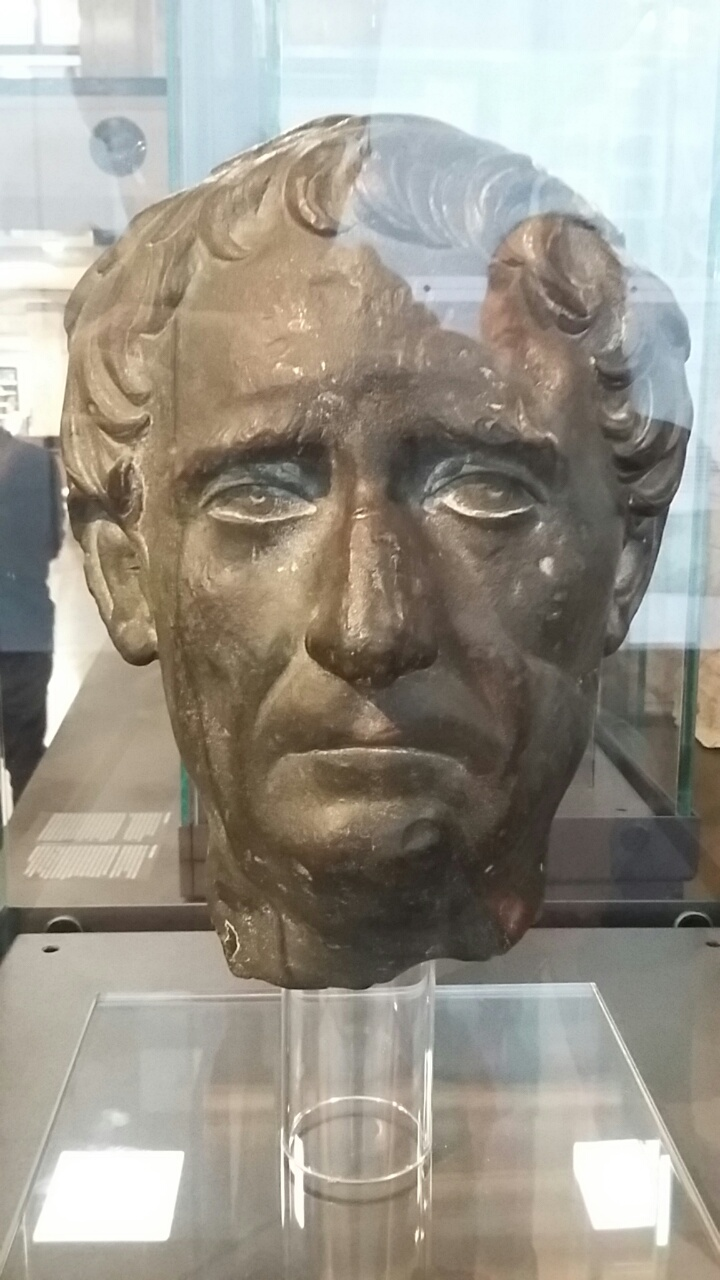
Bust of Marcus Ulpius Traianus (possibly the Elder) at the National Museum of Serbia

== History ==
Trajan's bridge was built in only three years (103–105 AD) by the famous architect Apollodorus of Damascus, at the same time as the fort. The bridge was considered the most daring work in the Roman world. Large canals, still visible in the marshy ground even today, were dug to lower Danube level and make construction of the piers easier. This may be the origin of the name Pontes (Bridges) as several temporary bridges had to be built across these canals and the Danube.

Repairs to the fort were done in the time of Marcus Aurelius and after being heavily damaged during the 2nd century a major reconstruction was done in the time of Septimius Severus at the beginning of the 3rd century. It suffered much destruction, like the Roman Empire and its frontiers in general, in conflicts with the Goths and the Huns in the 4th and the 5th centuries AD. The fort was restored during Justinian’s restoration of the Limes.

When the bridge was destroyed the fort lost its significance and was mostly abandoned, but a settlement of limitanei continued.
