= Suci (tribe) =

Dacian tribe located in what is now Oltenia

The Suci (Greek: Σοῦκοι or Σύκοι S(o)ukoi) were a Dacian tribe located in what is now Oltenia. Their main fortress was Sucidava, in what is now Corabia, on the north bank of the Danube. The Suci have been identified as ancestors of the Slauini mentioned by Menander Protector in the 6th century.
