= Devil's Dykes =

Linear earthworks

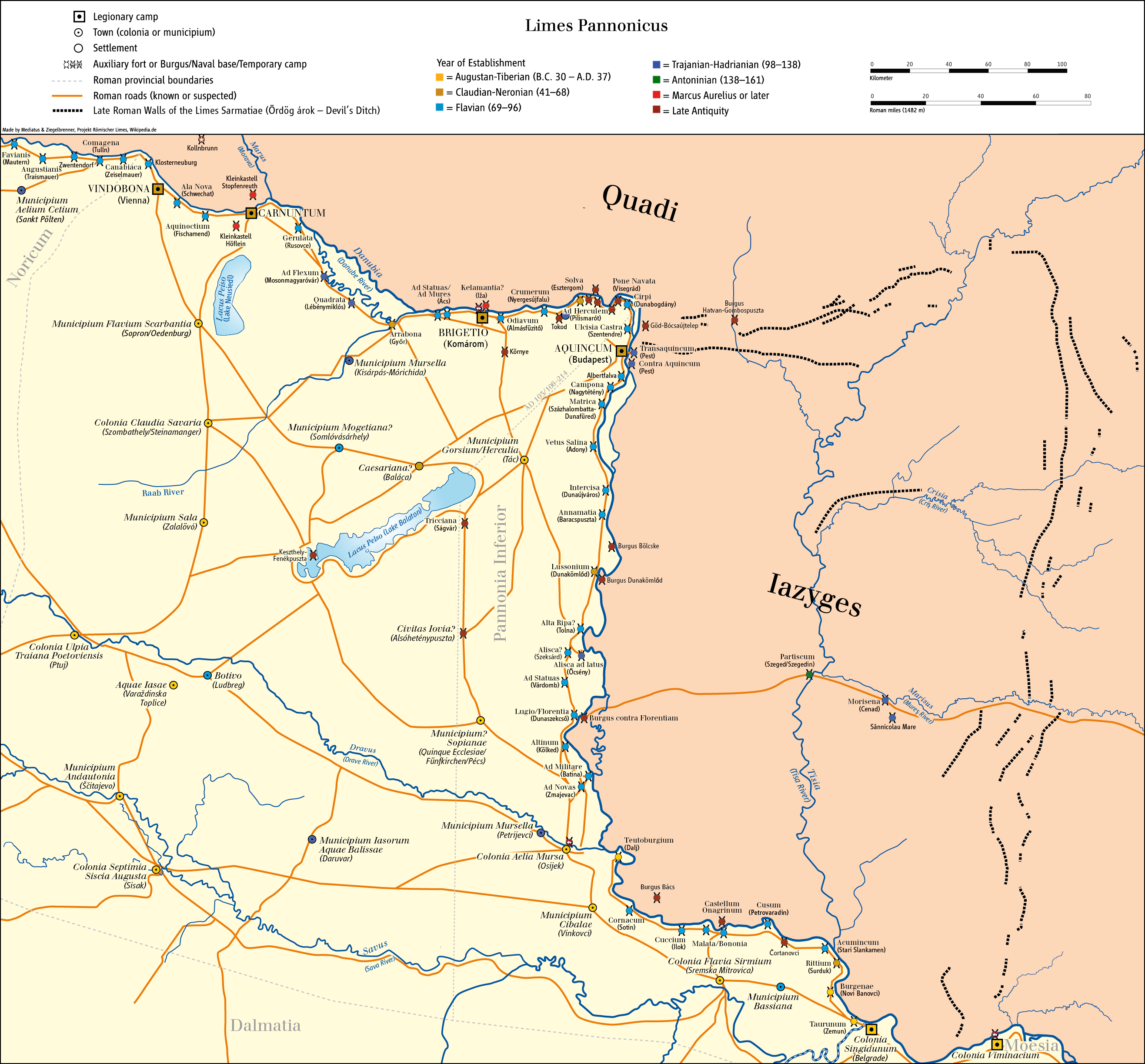
The "Limes Sarmatiae", "Devil's Dyke" or "Devil's Ditch" in eastern Pannonian plain, a group of lines of Roman fortifications done by Constantine I

The Devil's Dykes (Hungarian: Ördög árok), also known as the Csörsz árka ("Csörsz Ditch") or the Limes Sarmatiae (Latin for "Sarmatian border"), are several lines of Roman fortifications built mostly during the reign of Constantine the Great (306–337), stretching between today's Hungary, Romania and Serbia.

== History ==
The fortifications consisted of a series of defensive earthen ramparts-and-ditches surrounding the plain of the Tisia (Tisza) river. They stretched from Aquincum (within modern Budapest) eastwards, along the line of the northern Carpathian mountains to the vicinity of Debrecen and then, southwards to Viminacium (near modern Stari Kostolac).

They were probably intended to protect the territory of the Iazyges (a Sarmatian tribe inhabiting the Tisza plain that had been admitted to the Empire and reduced to tributary status by Constantine) from incursions by the surrounding Goths and Gepids.

Some elements of the fortifications, however, date from the 2^{nd} century AD and probably constituted an earlier defensive line constructed under emperor Marcus Aurelius (r. 161–180) at the time of the Marcomannic Wars, the previous occasion that the Tisza plain was occupied by the Romans.

The Limes Sarmatiae was intended to expand the Roman Limes and was built at the same time as the Constantine Wall in Wallachia (connected to the Limes Moesiae). It was, however, destroyed after a few years, at the end of the 4^{th} century.

Indeed, in 374 AD, the Quadi, a Germanic tribe in what is now Moravia and Slovakia, resenting the erection of Roman forts of the "Limes Sarmatiae" to the north and east of the Danube in what they considered to be their territory, and further exasperated by the treacherous murder of their king, Gabinius, crossed the river and laid waste to the province of Pannonia.

In 375, emperor Valentinian I retook Pannonia with several legions. After a short campaign that quickly defeated the Quadi, the fortifications of the "Limes Sarmatiae" were repaired. However, during an audience with an embassy from the Quadi at Brigetio on the River Danube (now Szőny in Hungary), the attitude of the envoys so enraged Valentinian that he suffered a stroke while angrily yelling at them, which led to his death on 17 November.

Following his death, political infighting and a lack of good leadership in the Roman Empire led to the "Limes Sarmatiae" being overrun and destroyed.

== See also ==
- Roman Limes
- Limes Moesiae
- Brazda lui Novac
- Wall of Constantine in Constantinople
- Deil's Dyke – A linear earthwork in south-west Scotland.
