= Castra of Tirighina-Bărboși =

Fort in the Roman province of Moesia

- Gherghina, Gherghena
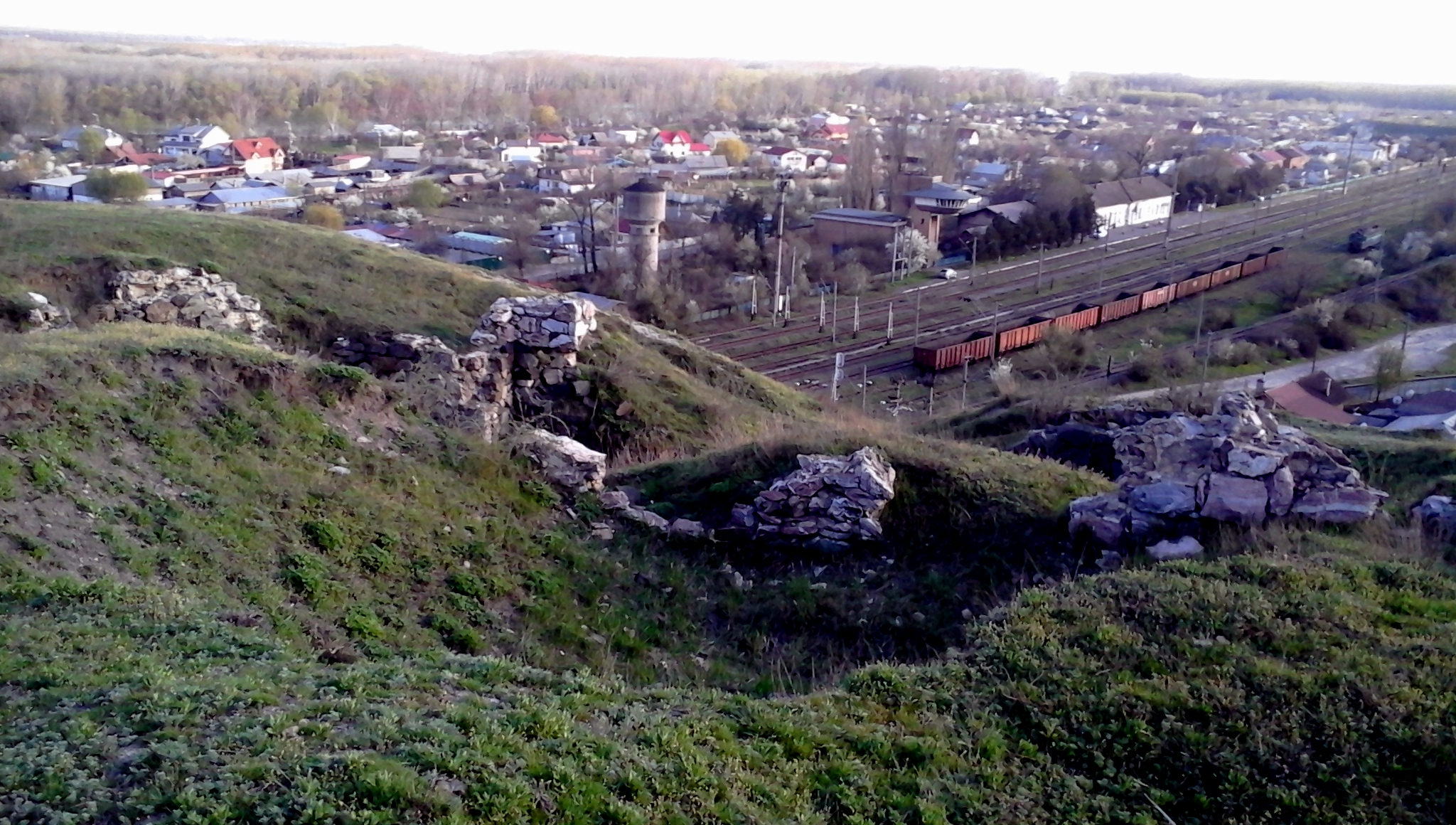
- Barbosi fort

- Location within Romania
- 45.4049°N 27.9896°E
- Location: Tirighina-Bărboși, Galați, Galați county, Romania

History
- Founded: 2nd century AD

Site notes
- Elevation: 9 m (30 ft)
- Excavation dates: 1959 - 1962
- Condition: Ruined

The Castra of Tirighina-Bărboși was a fort in the Roman province of Moesia, in the modern city of Galați, Romania.

It was a bridgehead fort on the north bank of the Danube near the confluence of the Siret river.

The archaeological complex covers approximately 10 hectares and includes the remains of a Roman fort, two Roman necropolises, one of which is a tumulus, a civil settlement on the Siret plain and in the western area of the Dunărea neighbourhood of Galați. It was built in the time of Trajan shown by a marble slab. Coins dating from the periods of Trajan, Antoninus Pius and Philip the Arab were discovered.

Its occupation continued until the 4th century, after most of Roman Dacia had been abandoned.

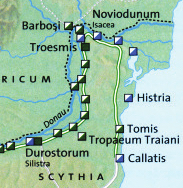
Later eastern Moesian Limes

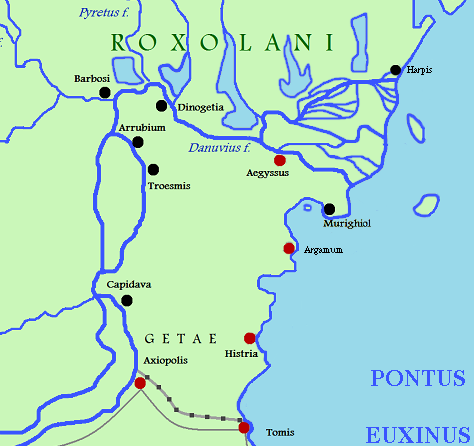
Eastern Moesia around 100 AD

== See also ==
- List of castra
