= Ripa Gothica =

Region of the Byzantine Empire

Ripa Gothia is a region of the Byzantine Empire mentioned by Flavius Dalmatius.
