= Constantiana Daphne =

Roman fortification

Daphne was a Roman fortification inaugurated, most probably in 327, on the left bank of the Danube, across Transmarisca, in the delta of the Arges river. In 367, emperor Valens crossed the Danube at Daphne using a pontoon bridge. Chronicler George Kedrenos, recounting the fight between the Varangians of Sveinald (Sviatoslav) and Emperor Ioan Tzimiskes in 971, mentioned the existence of wheat and millet sowings in the regions on the left bank of the Danube, which proves that this area was inhabited by a sedentary population. Encircled in Durostor (today Silistra), the Varangian armies supplied themselves at night with these grains and fodder transported from the opposite bank of the Danube. The same chronicler wrote that: "there came to him (before the emperor) from Constantia and other fortresses built beyond the Istru, messengers asking forgiveness for the evil deeds committed, surrendering together with those fortresses; receiving them gently, the emperor sent men to take possession of the cities and sufficient armies to guard them.”

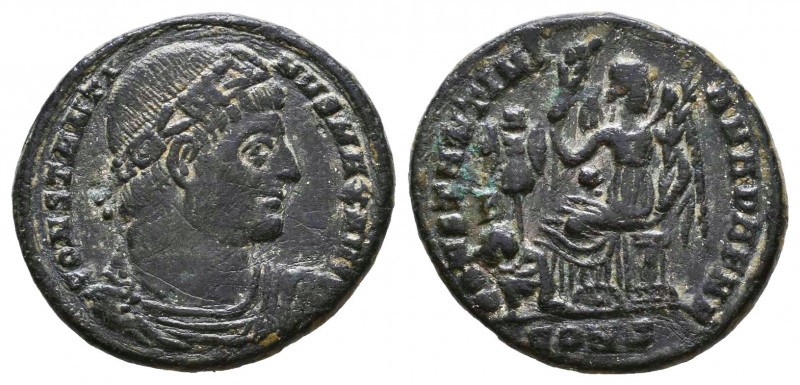

It was mentioned by Ammianus Marcellinus and Procopius of Caesarea.

The most probable position is at Grădiștea at south west of Ulmeni. Still some historians believe that the Daphne was the new name of the Sucidava- Celei.
