= Brazda lui Novac =

Roman frontier system in present-day Romania

Constantine's Wall in green

Brazda lui Novac ("Novac's Furrow") is a Roman frontier system (Latin: limes) in present-day Romania, known also as Constantine's Wall. It is believed by some historians to border Ripa Gothica.

The vallum of Brazda lui Novac starts from Drobeta, nowadays it is visible to Ploiești. There is some evidence that the vallum eastern limit was the Siret River. The height of the vallum was 3 metres and the ditch was 2 metres deep. It is believed that the wall was raised during Tiberius Plautius Aelianus. Some historians such as Ioan Donat date the wall during the 1st century AD, others date the wall to 322 during Constantine I.

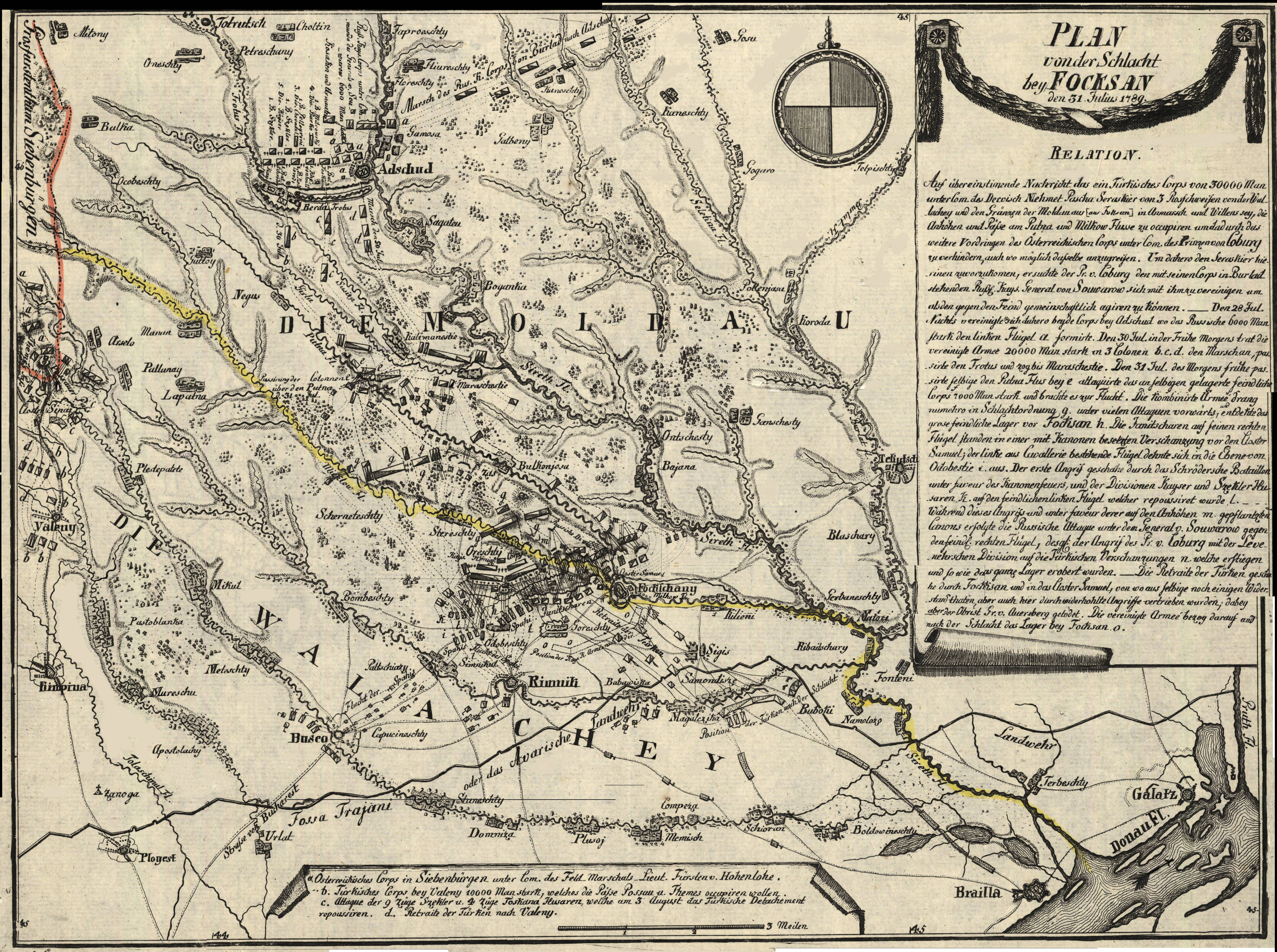
Fosa Traian depicted in 1789 map

== See also ==
- Devil's Dykes
- Wall of Constantine in Constantinople
- Trajan's Wall
