= Sucidava =

Dacian and Daco-Roman historical site in Corabia, Romania

Castra Sucidava
- Castra of Celeiu
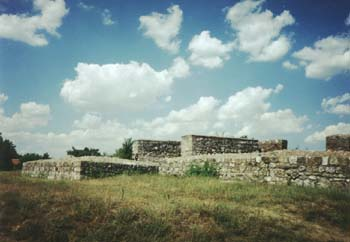
- Ruins of Sucidava, modern Romania

- Location within Romania
- 43.7644°N 24.4591°E
- Location: Cartier Celei, Corabia, Olt, Romania

History
- Abandoned: 6th century

Site notes
- Elevation: 37 m (121 ft)
- Excavation dates: 1900
- Archaeologists: Pamfil Polonic
- Condition: Ruined

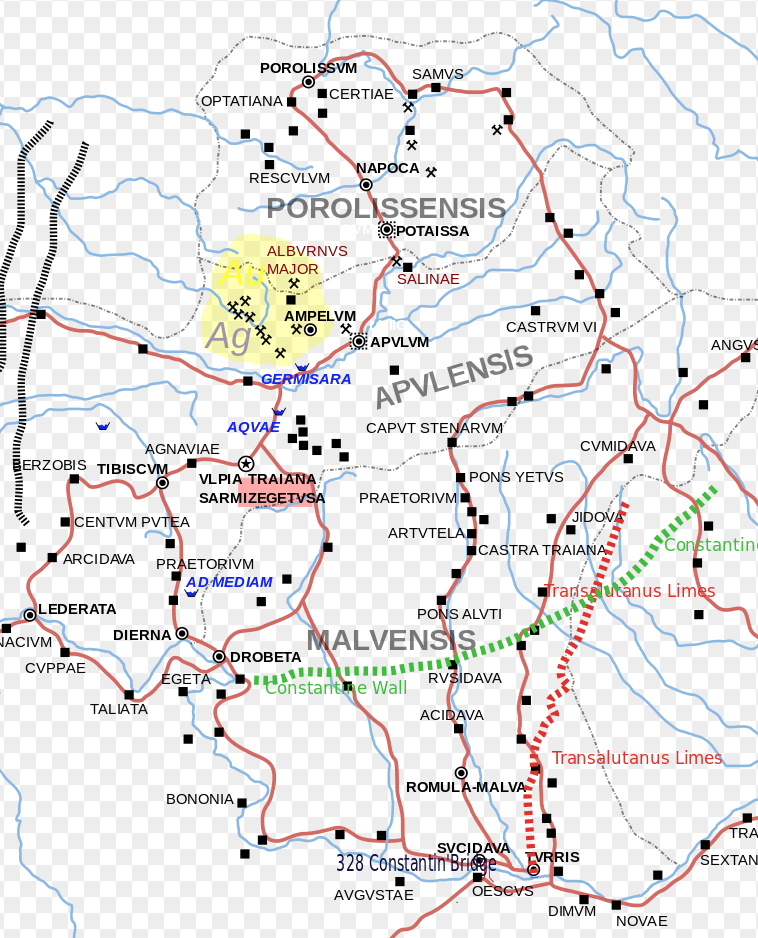
Western Dacia

Ancient fort of Sucidava - walls plan

Ancient city of Sucidava

Sucidava (Sykibid, Skedevà after Procopius of Caesarea, Σucidava after Vasile Pârvan, where Σ is pronounced "sh") was a Dacian and Daco-Roman city situated in Corabia, Romania, on the north bank of the Danube. It developed from the 270s AD and especially after the construction of Constantine's Bridge the northern side of which it protected.

== History ==
It was a significant economic and military centre of the Dacian Suci tribe.

The Roman fort, one of the largest Roman forts in Oltenia, was built over the former Dacian citadel in the 270s at the time of Roman withdrawal from Dacia to protect the Roman pontoon bridge and road there. The defensive walls with eight towers of the late Roman town of Sucidava can still be seen.

Constantine's Bridge (Danube) was built nearby over the Danube in 328 in order to start his reconquest of Dacia. Sucidava had its own defensive walls protecting the city and the bridge. The bridge connected to the Oescus fort in Bulgaria which protected its southern end.

The city developed around the fort. The archaeological evidence shows that in 443–447 the city and the fort were sacked by the Huns, and were restored under Justin I 518–527 or Justinian I 527–565. Around 600, it seems that the Roman garrison abandoned the city.

The first Christian Basilica established in Romania can be found there. There is also a secret underground fountain which flows under the walls of the town to a water spring situated outside.

The coins found at Sucidava show an uninterrupted series from Aurelian (270–275) to Theodosius II (408–450).

== See also ==
- List of castra
- List of castra in Romania

== Additional References ==
- Paul Lachlan MacKendrick, "The Dacian Stones Speak", Chapel Hill: University of North Carolina Press, 1975. ISBN 0-8078-1226-9
- Notitia Dignitatum cca 395-413
