= Limes Alutanus =

Roman limes of Dacia (modern Romania)

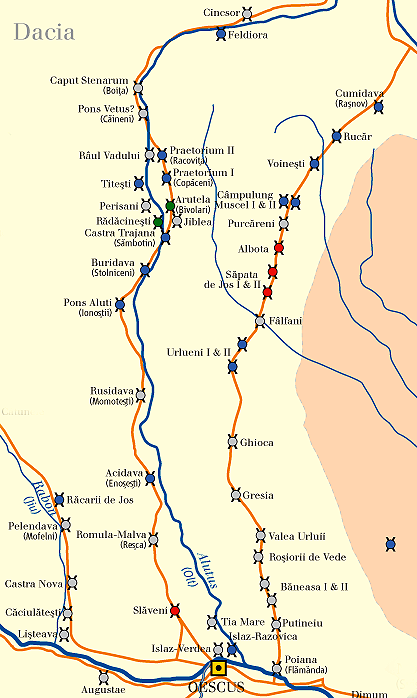
Forts on Limes Alutanus (to the left)

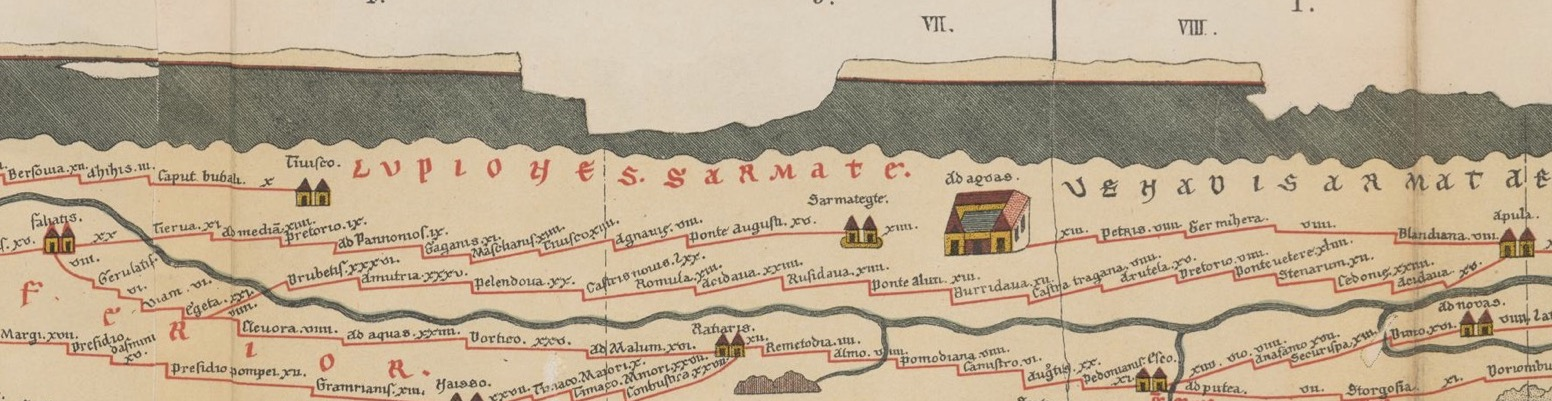
Tabula Peutingeriana: Limes Alutanus

The Limes Alutanus was a fortified eastern border of the ancient Roman province of Dacia built by the Roman emperor Hadrian to stop invasions and raids from the east.

It was part of the Dacian Limes frontier system. It was built along the Olt river (Latin Alutus) and included a vallum in the North-South direction on the eastern side of the river.

At least 12, and up to 16, forts are recorded on the Tabula Peutingeriana most of which have been confirmed by archaeological research, starting from the north:

- Cincșor
- Feldioara
- Caput Stenarum (Boiţa, Sibiu)
- Pons Vetus (Câineni, Vâlcea)
- Râul Vadului
- Praetorium II (Racovița)
- Praetorium I (Copăceni)
- Arutela ("Poiana Bivolari" point, near Călimăneşti town)
- Castra Traiana (Sânbotin, Vâlcea)
- Buridava (Stolniceni, Vâlcea)
- Pons Aluti (Ioneştii Govorei)
- Rusidava (Drăgăşani)
- Acidava (castra) (Enoşeşti)
- Romula (Reşca)

== See also ==
- Limes (Roman Empire)
- Limes Porolissensis
- Limes Transalutanus
