= Cozia National Park =

National park in Romania

- Parcul Național Cozia
- IUCN category II (national park)
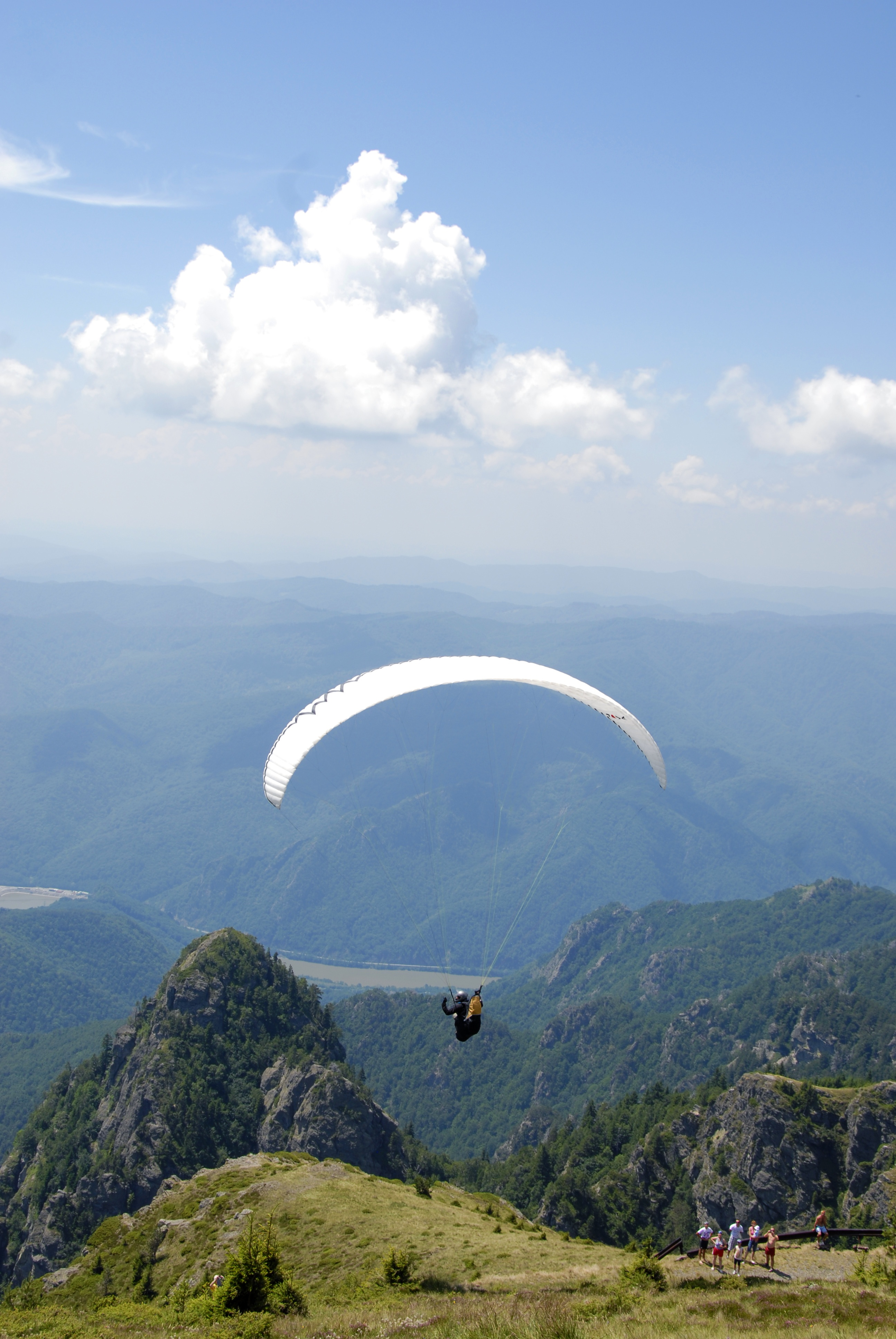
- The Cozia Massif

- Location within Romania
- Location: Vâlcea County; Romania
- Nearest city: Băile Olăneşti
- Coordinates: 45.367°N 24.265°E
- Area: 17,100 hectares (42,000 acres)
- Established: 2000, designation 1966
- Website: www.cozia.ro

The Cozia National Park (Romanian: Parcul Național Cozia) (national park category II IUCN) is located in south-central Romania, in the northeast part of Vâlcea County, in the administrative territory of localities Brezoi, Călimănești, Racoviţa, Perișani, Sălătrucel and Berislăvești.

== Location ==
The National Park is located in the central-southern of the Southern Carpathians, in the south-eastern Lotru Mountains and the east of Căpățânii Mountains on the middle course of Olt River.

== Description ==
Cozia National Park with an area of 171 km^{2} was declared a natural protected area by the Law Number.5 of March 6, 2000 (published in Romanian Official Paper, No.152 on April 12, 2000) and represents a mountainous area with flora and fauna specific to the Southern Carpathians. The park also has a sizable number of lichen species, which were studied in 2007. In 2017, two old-growth forests were inscribed in the Primeval Beech Forests of the Carpathians and Other Regions of Europe nature site.

This National Park is a mountainous area of great geological and geomorphological diversity (karst landscape with sharp peaks, tower karst, needle karst, limestone ridges, caves, gorges, valleys; forests, meadows and grassland) with several types of habitats (Alluvial forests with Alnus glutinosa and Fraxinus excelsior (Alno-Padion, Alnion incanae, Salicion albae), Dacian beech forests of Luzulo-Fagetum type, Dacian beech forests of Asperulo-Fagetum type, Oak forests with hornbeam of Galio-Carpinetum type, Tilio-Acerion forests on steep slopes, screes and ravines, Dacian beech forests (Symphyto-Fagion), Acidophilous Picea abies forests of the montane region (Vaccinio-Piceetea), Alpine and boreal shrubberies, Boreal and alpine meadows on siliceous substrate, Species-rich montane Nardus meadows on siliceous substrate, Tree line communities of tall hygrophilous grasses from lowland to montane and alpine levels, Siliceous screes of the montane to alpine levels (Androsacetalia alpinae and Galeopsietalia ladani), Mountain meadows, Herbaceous vegetation on the banks of mountain rivers, Rocky slopes with chasmophytic vegetation on calcareous rocks, Woody vegetation with Myricaria germanica along mountain rivers and Woody vegetation with Salix eleagnos along mountain rivers) supporting a diverse range of flora and fauna specific to the Southern Carpathian range.
