= Șasa River =

Șasa River may refer to:

- Șasa, a tributary of the Bistra Mărului
- Șasa, a tributary of the Băiaș in Vâlcea County
