= CS Viitorul Dăești =

Romanian football club

Viitorul Dăești
- Full name: Clubul Sportiv Viitorul Dăești
- Nicknames: Dăeștenii (The Dăești People)
- Short name: Viitorul
- Founded: 2012
- Dissolved: 2026
- Ground: Gheorghe Ciociu
- Capacity: 1,500 (500 seated)
- 2025–26: Liga III, Seria VI, 11th (relegated)
Home colours	Away colours

Clubul Sportiv Viitorul Dăești, commonly known as Viitorul Dăești, was a Romanian football club originally from Dăești, Vâlcea County, and currently playing in Liga IV, the fourth tier of the Romanian football league system, after was relegated at the end of the 2025–26 season.

== History ==
Viitorul Dăești was established in the summer of 2012 at the initiative of George Popolan, the mayor of Dăești commune. The club was enrolled directly in the Liga IV – Vâlcea County, the fourth tier of the Romanian football, and finished their first season on 5th place in the North Series.

Viitorul continued to play in the North Series of the Liga IV – Vâlcea County ranking 4th in the 2013–14 season and 3rd in the 2014–15 season, and 11th in the 2015–16 season played in a single series.

In the 2016–17 season, Viitorul Dăești, coached by Cosmin Ursu, won the Liga IV – Vâlcea County qualifying for the promotion play-off to Liga III, but lost to AS Milcov (0–0 at home and 0–2 away), the winner of Liga IV – Olt County.

In the 2017–18 season, Viitorul finished the regular season in third place, eleven points behind first place Flacăra Horezu with no chance of promotion, and Cosmin Ursu was replaced with Gabriel Mangalagiu who led the club to finish as runners-up in the play-off.

At the end of the 2018–19 season, Viitorul promoted to Liga III winning Liga IV – Vâlcea County and the promotion play-off played against Real Bradu (2–1 at Bradu and 3–0 at Dăești), the winner of Liga IV – Argeș County. The squad led by Gabriel Mangalagiu was composed of among others by Dragoș Geantă, Ion Armeanu, Octavian Vasile, Ioan Săraru, Andrei Fistogeanu, Lucian Iordache, Ionuț Lăzărescu, Florian Pârvu, Gabriel Rizea, Leonard Săraru, Raul Horumbă, George Neacșu, Marian Roșianu, Ion Marian, Alin Bucei, Ștefan Pașoi, Cătălin Moldoveanu and Bogdan Preda.

The 2019–20 campaign saw the debut of Viitorul in Liga III, "Dăeștenii" finished on eleventh place in the 4th Series in a season curtailed due to the COVID-19 pandemic in Romania.

After a mediocre start of the 2020–21 season, ninth place with just three points in four rounds, Mangalagiu was sacked and replaced with Lucian Giurcă. A month later, Petre Gigiu was appointed the new head coach, but he was replaced in January with Adrian Popa who, with a core of players such as Florin Costea, Lucian Iordache, Florian Pârvu, Samson Nwabueze or Cristian Munteanu among others, leads the club on third place in its series at the end of the season.

The 2021–22 season was a successful campaign, finishing second in both the regular season and the play-off of 6th series, Viitorul qualify for promotion play-offs to Liga II, losing in the first round to Odorheiu Secuiesc, 0–2 on aggregate.

== Honours ==
Liga III

- Runners-up (2): 2021–22, 2022–23

Liga IV – Vâlcea County

- Winners (2): 2016–17, 2018–19
- Runners-up (1): 2017–18

== League history ==
Season	Tier	Division	Place	Notes	Cupa României
2025–26	3	Liga III (Seria VI)	TBD		
2024–25	3	Liga III (Seria VIII)	7th		Second round
2023–24	3	Liga III (Seria VI)	4th		Second round
2022–23	3	Liga III (Seria VI)	2nd		Second round
2021–22	3	Liga III (Seria VI)	2nd		Second round
2020–21	3	Liga III (Seria VII)	3rd		Fourth round
2019–20	3	Liga III (Seria IV)	11th		

Season	Tier	Division	Place	Notes	Cupa României
2018–19	4	Liga IV (VL)	1st (C)	Promoted	
2017–18	4	Liga IV (VL)	2nd		
2016–17	4	Liga IV (VL)	1st (C)		
2015–16	4	Liga IV (VL)	11th		
2014–15	4	Liga IV (VL) (North Series)	3rd		
2013–14	4	Liga IV (VL) (North Series)	4th		
2012–13	4	Liga IV (VL) (North Series)	5th		

== Notable former players ==
The footballers mentioned below have played at least 1 season for Viitorul and also played in Liga I for another team.

- (Romania) Adrian Albinaru
- (Romania) Florin Cioablă
- (Romania) Ionuț Cioinac
- (Romania) Florin Costea
- (Romania) Mihai Costea
- (Romania) Cristian Munteanu
- (Nigeria) Samson Nwabueze
- (Romania) Florian Pârvu
- (Romania) Cătălin Pârvulescu
- (Romania) Cosmin Ursu
