= Pripoare =

Pripoare may refer to several villages in Romania:

- Pripoare, a village in Sânger Commune, Mureș County
- Pripoare, a village in Perișani Commune, Vâlcea County
