= Pârâul Sec =

Pârâul Sec may refer to:

- Pârâul Sec, a tributary of the Brătei in Dâmbovița County
- Pârâul Sec, a tributary of the Costești in Vâlcea County
- Pârâul Sec, a tributary of the Dămuc in Neamț County
- Pârâul Sec, a tributary of the Lotru in Vâlcea County
- Pârâul Sec (Olt), a tributary of the Olt in Vâlcea County
- Pârâul Sec, a tributary of the Prahova in Brașov County
- Pârâul Sec, a tributary of the Rudăreasa in Vâlcea County
