= Stadionul Gheorghe Ciociu =

Multi-purpose stadium in Romania

- Interactive map of Stadionul Gheorghe Ciociu
- Former names: Stadionul Fedeleșoiu
- Address: DJ703F
- Location: Fedeleșoiu, Romania
- Coordinates: 45°08′28.9″N 24°23′53.9″E
- Owner: Commune of Dăești
- Capacity: 1,500 (500 seated)
- Surface: Grass

Tenant
- Viitorul Dăești (2012–2026)

Stadionul Gheorghe Ciociu is a multi-purpose stadium in the Fedeleșoiu village, Dăești commune, Romania. It is currently used mostly for football matches, wa the home ground of Viitorul Dăești and holds 1,500 people (500 on seats).
