= Valea Dosului River =

Valea Dosului River may refer to:

- Valea Dosului, a tributary of the Bega Veche in Timiș County, Romania
- Dosul, a tributary of the Băiaș in Vâlcea County, Romania
