= Cristian Lucian Munteanu =

Romanian footballer

Cristian Munteanu
Personal information
- Full name: Cristian Lucian Munteanu
- Date of birth: 17 October 1980 (age 46)
- Place of birth: Arad, Romania
- Height: 1.82 m (5 ft 11 1/2 in)
- Position: Centre back

Team information
- Current team: Viitorul Dăești (player-manager)
- Number: 28

Senior career*
Years	Team	Apps	(Gls)
2000–2001	West Petrom Arad	–	(0)
2001–2006	Bihor Oradea	103	(6)
2006–2007	Sopron	35	(1)
2007–2010	Politehnica Iași	84	(5)
2010–2011	Târgu Mureș	19	(4)
2011–2013	Brașov	59	(3)
2013–2014	Săgeata Năvodari	31	(4)
2014	CSMS Iași	17	(1)
2015	Universitatea Cluj	11	(1)
2015	Viitorul Constanța	2	(0)
2016–2017	Râmnicu Vâlcea	13	(0)
2017	Metalul Reșița	12	(0)
2017	Olimpia Satu Mare	16	(2)
2018	Pandurii Târgu Jiu	14	(2)
2018–2020	Flacăra Horezu	30	(10)
2021–2023	Viitorul Dăești	27	(4)
2023–	Viitorul Arad	0	(0)

Managerial career
- 2019–2020: Flacăra Horezu (assistant)
- 2021–2022: Viitorul Dăești (assistant)
- 2022–2023: Viitorul Dăești
- 2023–: Unirea Bascov U-19
- * Club domestic league appearances and goals as of 07:52, 21 June 2022 (UTC)

Cristian Lucian Munteanu (born 17 October 1980) is a Romanian footballer who plays as a central defender for Viitorul Dăești.

== Club career ==
=== Early career ===
Munteanu started his professional career at the age of twenty with the local club West Petrom Arad, in the Romanian Liga III. He spent a year playing for his home side.

=== FC Bihor ===
He was soon noticed by Liga II club FC Bihor Oradea, who bought him from Petrom Arad. There, Munteanu quickly established himself in the starting eleven and he spent four and a half years with the team, also playing in the 2003–04 Liga I.

=== MFC Sopron ===
In the summer of 2005 Munteanu moved to MFC Sopron in the first division of Hungary. Due to financial problems, he left after two season and 35 matches.

=== Politehnica Iaşi ===
On 1 July 2007, he was bought by Politehnica Iaşi for a fee of €50,000. Here he rejoined his former coach at FC Bihor, Ionuţ Popa. Munteanu immediately imposed himself in the starting lineup, and he stayed there until the end of the 2009–10 Liga I season when Poli were relegated to the Liga II.

=== CSMS Iași ===
In the summer of 2014, he returned to Iași, signing a contract with CSMS.
