= Băiaș =

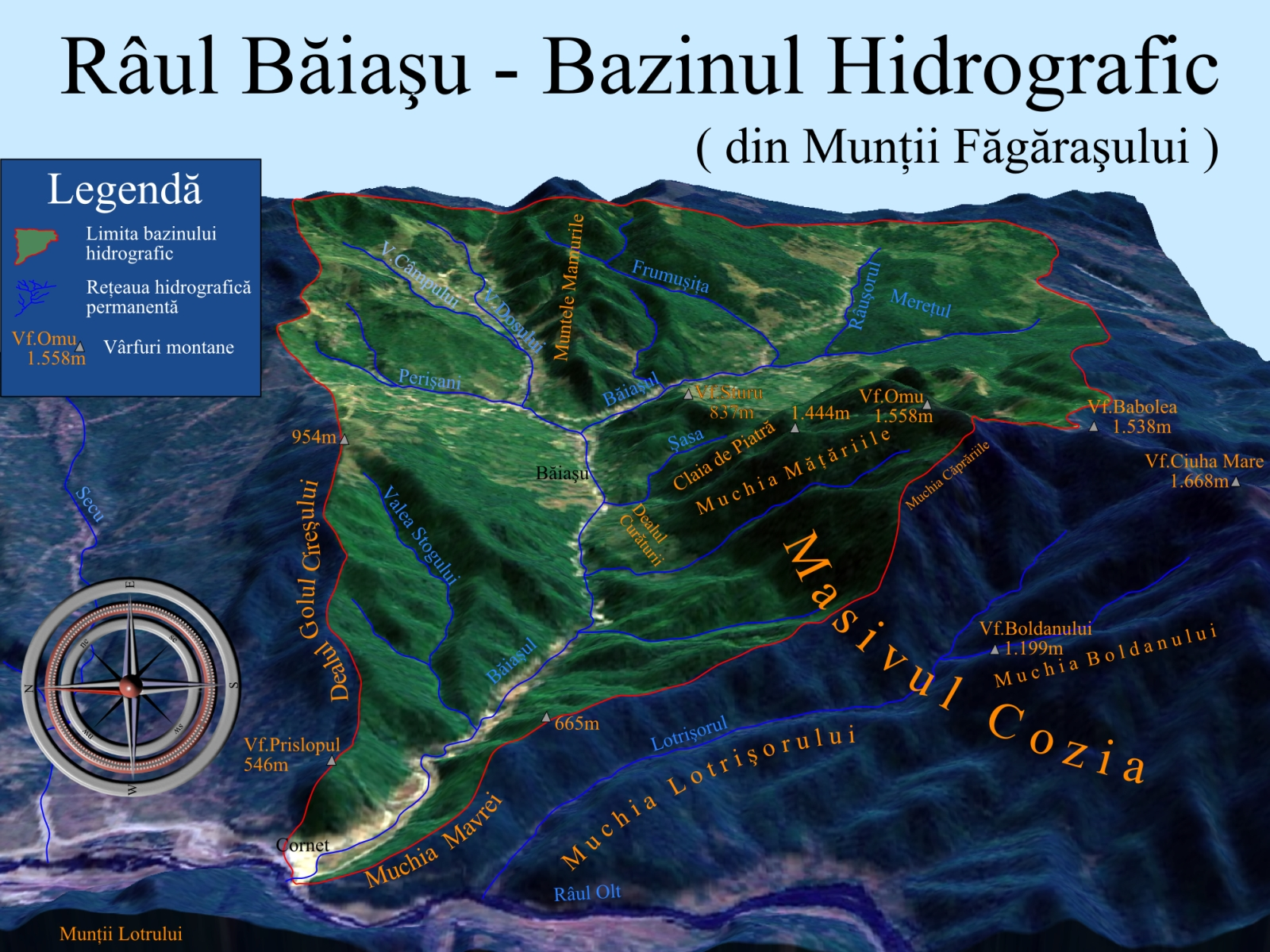
- Băuaș river Basin

- Location within Romania

Location
- Country: Romania
- Counties: Vâlcea County
- Villages: Surdoiu, Pripoare, Băiașu

Physical characteristics
- Source: Cozia Mountains
- Mouth: Olt
  - location: Copăceni
  - coordinates: 45.3856°N 24.3005°E
- Length: 19 km (12 mi)
- Basin size: 87 km^{2} (34 sq mi)

Basin features
- Progression: Olt→ Danube→ Black Sea

The Băiaș is a left tributary of the river Olt in Romania. It discharges into the Olt in Copăceni. Its length is 19 km (12 mi) and its basin size is 87 km^{2} (34 sq mi).

== Tributaries ==
The following rivers are tributaries to the river Băiaș (from source to mouth):

- Left: Grebla, Roșia, Pârâul Șasei, Pârâul Posăzii, Pârâul Starului, Șasa, Călugăreasa, Piatra Acră, Mocirlele
- Right: Râușorul, Frumușița, Dosul, Valea Stogului
