= Praetorium I (Copăceni) =

Praetorium
- Location within Romania
- 45.3945707°N 24.31382979°E
- Location: La moară, Copăceni, Vâlcea, Romania

History
- Founded: 2nd century AD
- Built: Trajan

Site notes
- Excavation dates: 1894
- Archaeologists: Pamfil Polonic; Mihail Macrea
- Condition: Ruined

Praetorium I (Copăceni) was a fort in the Roman province of Dacia near the present village of Copăceni, Racovița, Vâlcea, Romania. It was part of the Roman frontier system of the Limes Alutanus along the Olt (river). It was built in 138 and reinforced with two towers two years later.

A civil settlement and baths dating from the II-III centuries were nearby. Two-thirds of the site has been destroyed by the river.

It was about 0.5 km from another fort, Praetorium II (Racoviţa).

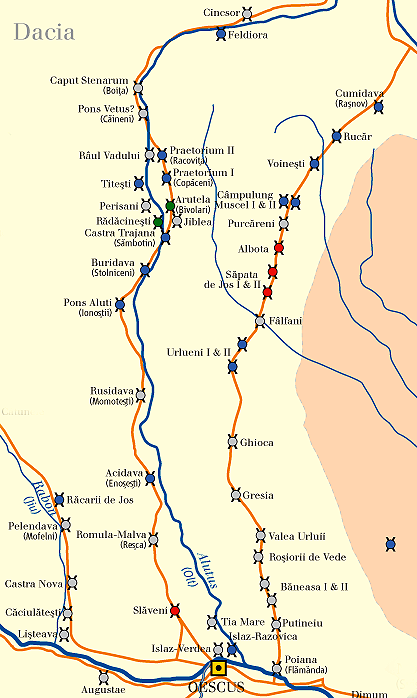
Forts on Limes Alutanus (to the left)

== See also ==
- List of castra
