= Ion Duminicel =

Romanian bobsledder

Personal information
- Nationality: Romanian
- Born: 15 August 1954 (age 70); Călimănești, Romania

Sport
- Sport: Bobsleigh

Ion Duminicel (born 15 August 1954) is a Romanian bobsledder. He competed at the 1980 Winter Olympics and the 1984 Winter Olympics.
