= Arutela =

Ancient Roman fort

Coordinates: 45.276667°N 24.311944°E

- Castra of Căciulata, Castra of Bivolari; Arutelia
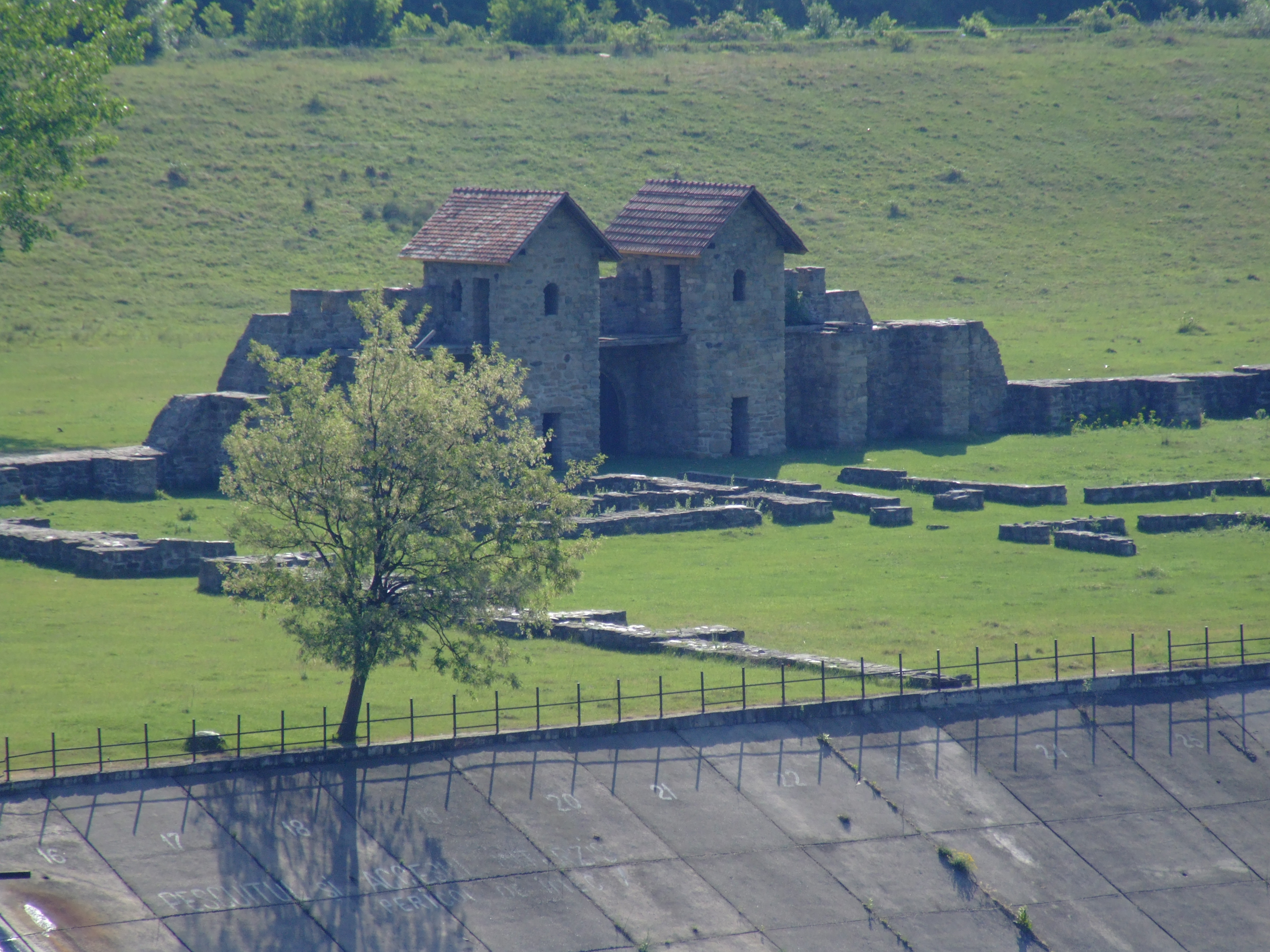

- Location within Romania
- Location: Poiana Bivolari, Căciulata, Romania

History
- Founded: 138
- Built: Hadrian
- Abandoned: 3rd century AD

Site notes
- Elevation: 285 m (935 ft)
- Excavation dates: 1894
- Archaeologists: Pamfil Polonic, Dumitru Tudor
- Discovered: 1888
- Condition: Partially reconstructed

Arutela was an ancient Roman fort in the Roman province of Dacia today near the town Călimănești. It lies on the left bank of the Olt River. It was part of the Roman frontier system of the Limes Alutanus.

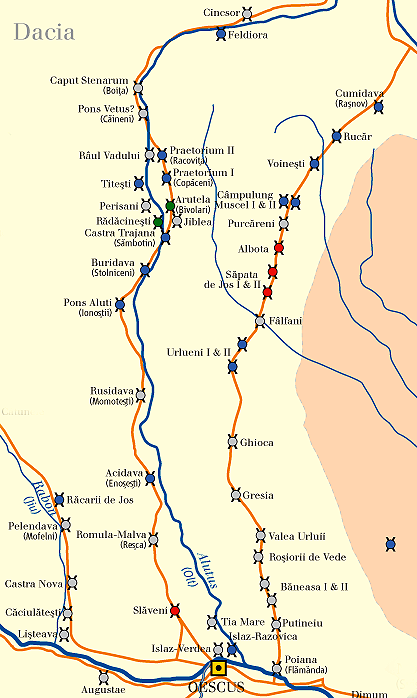
Limes Alutanus (left)

== History ==
It was constructed between 137 – 138 AD by Surri sagittari (Syrian archers) by the order of Titus Flavius Constans, imperial procurator of Dacia Inferior, according to inscriptions on the front of two of the castra's gates.

The last coins discovered and dated at Arutela were issued by Elagabalus between the years 220 – 223 AD.

Arutela also hosted a Dacian settlement, which enjoyed a prolonged existence under Roman rule.

== Archaeology ==
The first excavations at "Poiana Bivolari" were made in 1888–1889 in order to capture sulfurous thermal water. The excavation uncovered metal objects and Roman coins of Hadrian, Septimius Severus, Iulia Doamna and Caracalla. Between 1890 and 1892, Grigore Tocilescu and Pamfil Polonic continued with partial excavations, completely uncovering Roman baths and partial ruins of the castra. These discoveries remain the only epigraphic materials found on the site. Between 1897 and 1902, the Arutela ruins were partially covered by the construction of a railroad between Râmnicu Vâlcea and Râul Vadului, while the baths disappeared completely.

In 1967, the National Military Museum reopened the research site until 1970, and opened it once more in 1978. The opening led to the complete exposure of the ruins which were not destroyed by the railroad construction.

The archaeological excavations uncovered weapons, coins, pots and inscriptions, on display today at the Bucharest National Military Museum. After the excavations finished, the Arutela castrum became a historical monument of the Vâlcea County Committee of Culture and the Museum of History in Râmnicu Vâlcea. In 1982–1983, the castrum was renewed in a project by the architect Aurel Teodorescu, following references prepared by Cristian Vlădescu, the coordinator of research previously performed by the Military Museum. The construction work was executed by C. Panco. The first "Praetorian gate" (porta praetoria) in Romania was reconstructed on the site.

== Images ==
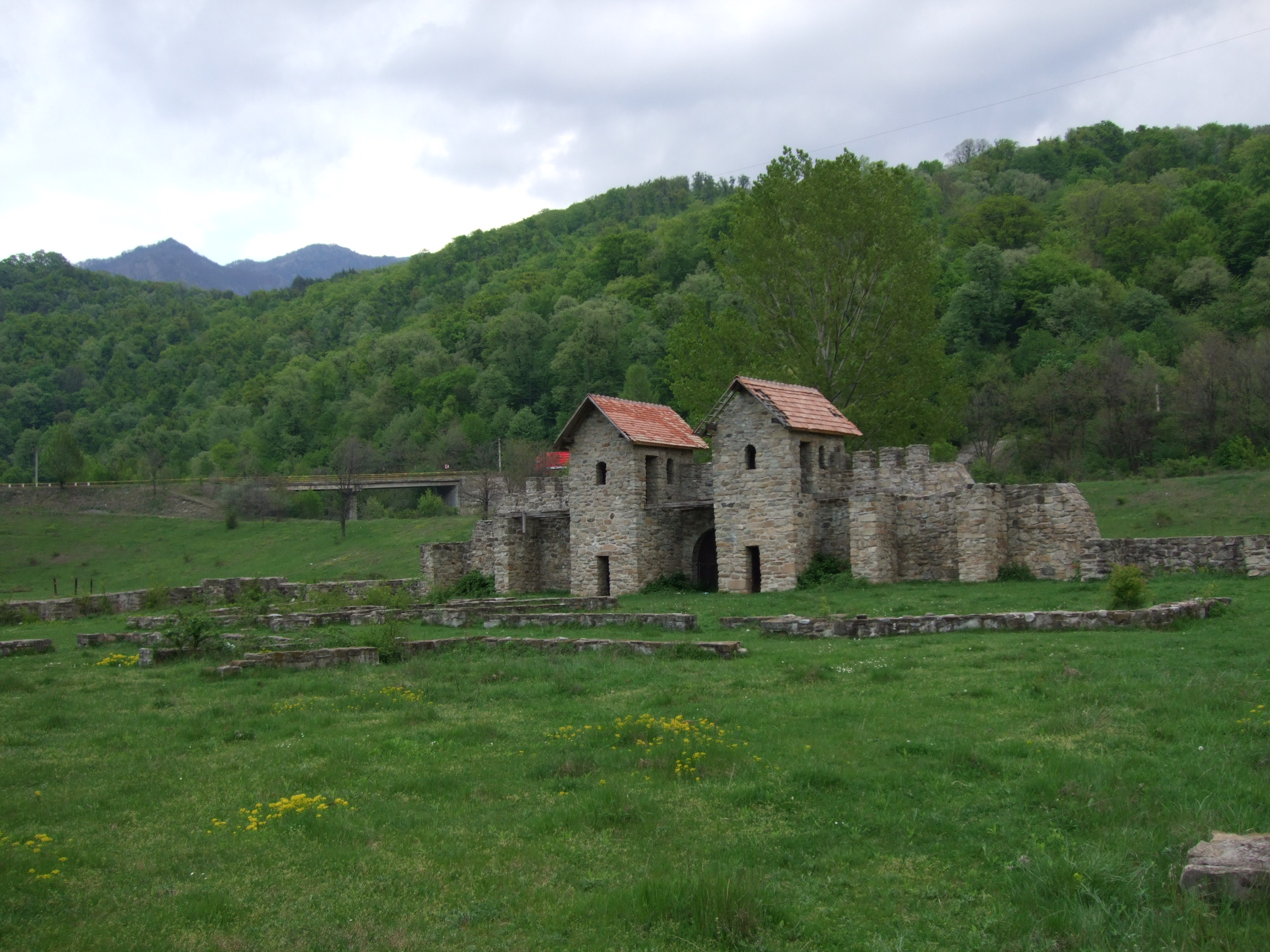

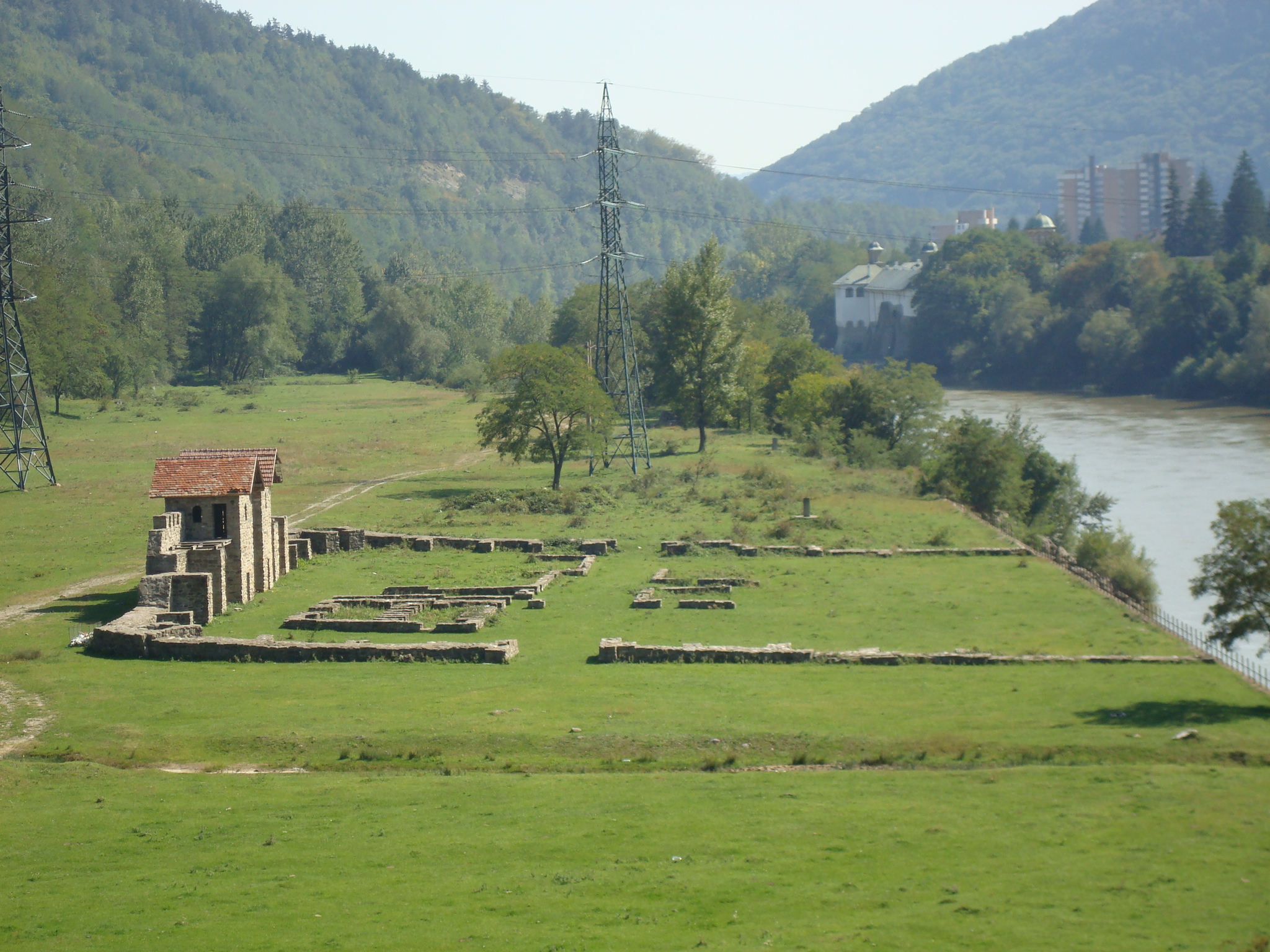

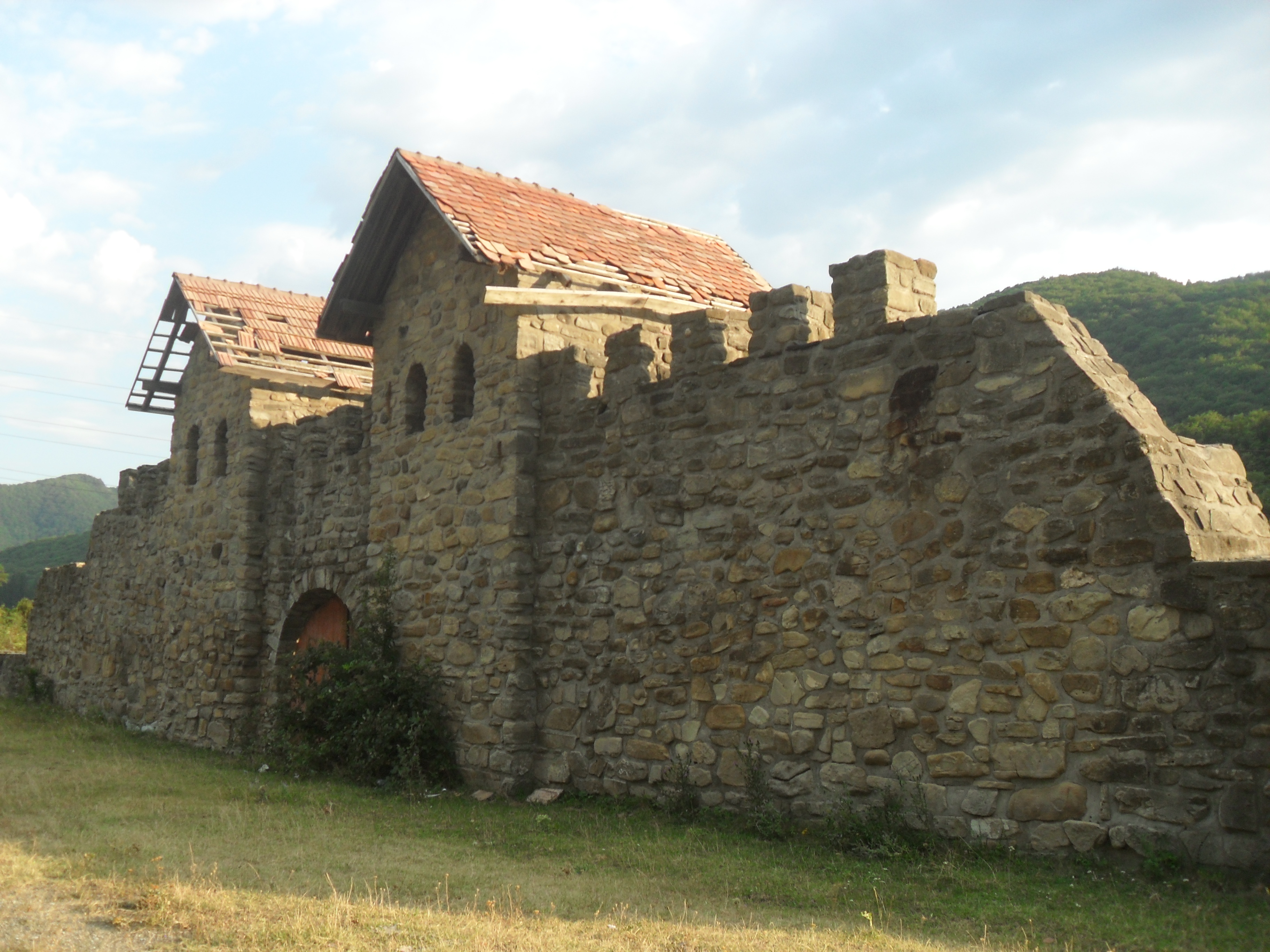

== See also ==
- Dacian davae
- List of ancient cities in Thrace and Dacia
- Dacia
- Roman Dacia
