= Castra Traiana =

Roman fort

- Castra of Dăești
- Location within Romania
- 45°12′33″N 24°22′38″E
- Location: Dăești, Vâlcea, Romania

History
- Founded: 2nd century AD

Site notes
- Excavation dates: 1931
- Discovered: 1931
- Condition: Ruined

Castra Traiana (also known as Sambotin) was a fort in the Roman province of Dacia on the Limes Alutanus near the present town of Dăești, Romania.

The first fort was an earthen enclosure with 2 defensive ditches built probably between 102-105 during Trajan's Dacian Wars. It was rebuilt in stone in the first half of the 2nd century as revealed by archaeological excavations between 1981 and 1994. The cohors Hispanorum is recorded on brick stamps.

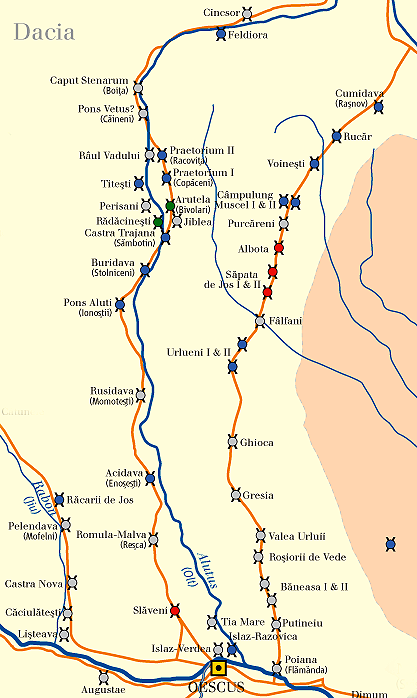
Limes Alutanus (left)

== See also ==
- List of castra
