= Praetorium II (Racovița) =

Coordinates: 45°24′02.9″N 24°18′39.3″E

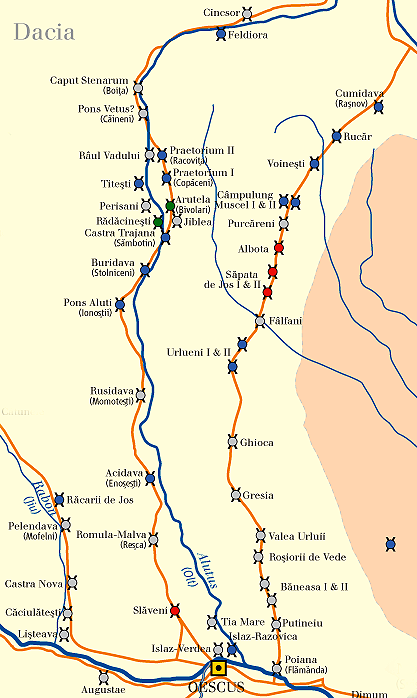
Forts on Limes Alutanus (to the left)

Plan of fort

Praetorium II (Racovița) was a fort in the Roman province of Dacia near the present village of Racovița, Vâlcea. It was built in the middle of the 3rd century, part of the Roman frontier system of the Limes Alutanus along the Olt (river) and was the largest fort in the mountain area of the Limes.

It was about 0.5 km from another fort, Praetorium I (Copăceni).

== See also ==
- List of castra
