= Florian Pârvu =

Romanian footballer

Personal information
- Full name: Florian Dumitru Pârvu
- Date of birth: 30 April 1991 (age 35)
- Place of birth: Râmnicu Vâlcea, Romania
- Height: 1.76 m (5 ft 9 in)
- Position: Midfielder

Youth career
- Ciobanu Râmnicu Vâlcea

Senior career*
Years	Team	Apps	(Gls)
2007–2013	Râmnicu Vâlcea	80	(4)
2013	Universitatea Craiova	3	(0)
2014	Corona Brașov	6	(0)
2014	Costuleni	4	(0)
2015	Caransebeș	10	(0)
2016	Râmnicu Vâlcea	12	(0)
2017	Metalul Reșița	6	(0)
2017	Șirineasa	1	(2)
2017	Luceafărul Oradea	3	(0)
2018–2023	Viitorul Dăești	70	(21)
2023–2024	Flacăra Horezu	14	(3)
2024–2026	Râmnicu Vâlcea	0	(0)
- * Club domestic league appearances and goals as of 17:24, 16 January 2024 (UTC)

Florian Dumitru Pârvu (born 30 April 1991) is a Romanian professional footballer who plays as a midfielder.

== Honours ==
Viitorul Dăești

- Liga IV: 2018–19
