= Pârâul Sec (Olt) =

- Location within Romania

Location
- Country: Romania
- Counties: Vâlcea County
- Villages: Titești, Bratovești, Bradu-Clocotici

Physical characteristics
- Mouth: Olt
  - location: Racovița
  - coordinates: 45.4021°N 24.3055°E
- Length: 11 km (6.8 mi)
- Basin size: 50 km^{2} (19 sq mi)

Basin features
- Progression: Olt→ Danube→ Black Sea
- Tributaries
  - left: Barbu
  - right: Bumbuești

The Pârâul Sec is a left tributary of the river Olt in Romania. It flows into the Olt near Racovița. Its length is 11 km (6.8 mi) and its basin size is 50 km^{2} (19 sq mi).
