= Rusidava (castra) =

Fort in the Roman province of Dacia

- Castra of Drăgășani; Zusidava
- Location within Romania
- 44°39′N 24°15′E
- Location: Momotești neighborhood, Drăgășani, Olt, Romania

History
- Founded: 2nd century AD

Site notes
- Condition: Ruined

Rusidava was a fort in the Roman province of Dacia, part of the frontier system of the Limes Alutanus.

== See also ==
- List of castra
