= Castra of Cincșor =

Ancient Roman fort in Romania

- Castra of Voila
- Location within Romania
- 45.84252°N 24.86661°E
- Location: Grădiște, Cincşor, Brașov, Romania

History
- Founded: 2nd century AD
- Abandoned: 3rd century AD

Site notes
- Elevation: 545 m (1,788 ft)
- Excavation dates: 1980; 1988; 1991
- Archaeologists: L. I. Pop; L. Dumitru; L. Petculescu; E. Oberländer–Târnoveanu; D. Isac
- Condition: Ruined

The castra of Cincșor was a fort in the Roman province of Dacia in the 2nd and 3rd centuries AD and part of the frontier system of the Limes Alutanus.

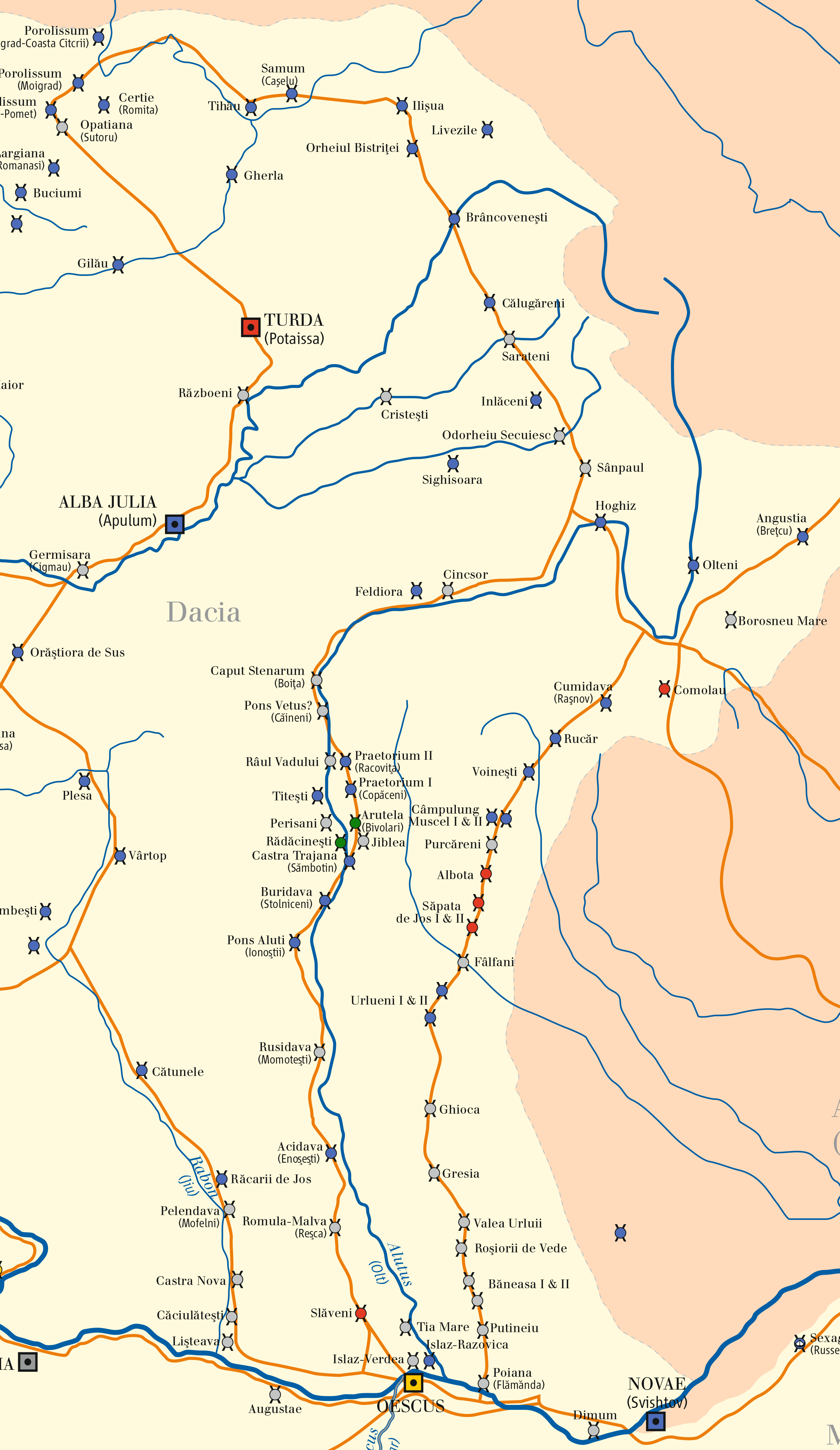
Limes Alutanus + Transalutanus

== Location ==
The ruins of this cohort fort are located about two km east of the village Cincșor, commune Voila, and about one km north of the river Olt in the corridor "Burgstadt". In ancient times, it probably had the task of monitoring the movement of goods on the Olt and the Cincu Pass to the north.

== Finds ==
During the archaeological excavations of the years 1974/1975 and 1979 to 1992, trenches were dug determining the location of the fort. Two construction phases could be distinguished: there was initially a wood-and-earth storage facility, which was later replaced by a stone fort. The stone fort had a rectangular ground plan and on the west side was a defensive wall and four ditches. The date is uncertain, but epigraphic finds could identify the Cohors II Flavia Bessorum as the stationed unit.

A funerary inscription for a Roman military official, L. Carvilius Rusticinus, was discovered near the fort.

In 1986 an excavator discovered a bronze parade mask nearby the fort, in the area of the reservoir lake. The mask depicts a woman's head. It has 24.5 cm height, 17 cm width and 14.5 cm depth.

== Exhibition ==
The archaeological finds can be found in the Muzeul Țării Țării in Făgăraș and in Muzeul Județean Brașov in Brașov.

== Monument protection ==
The archaeological site and in particular the fort are protected as historical monuments.

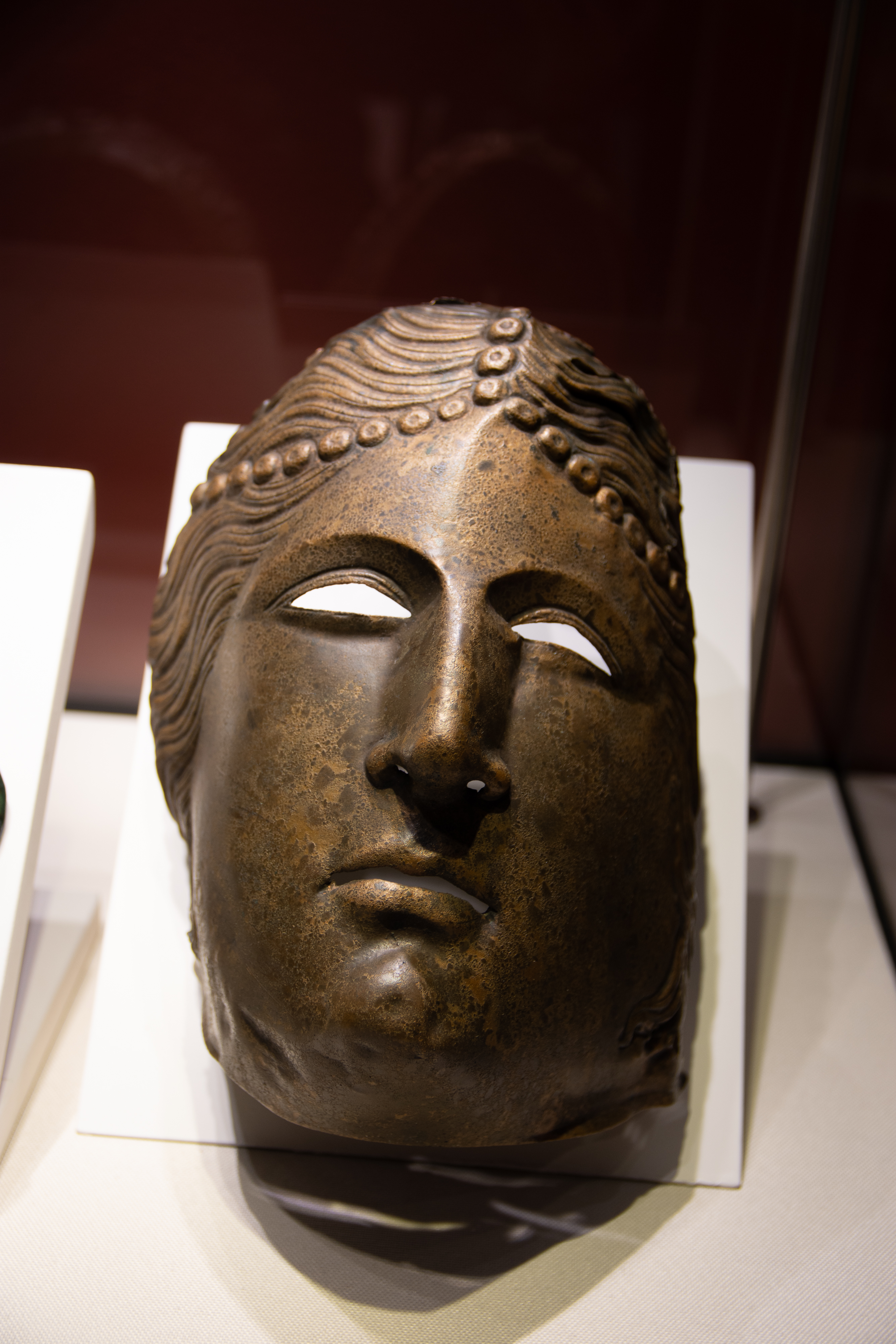
Parade mask found near the fort

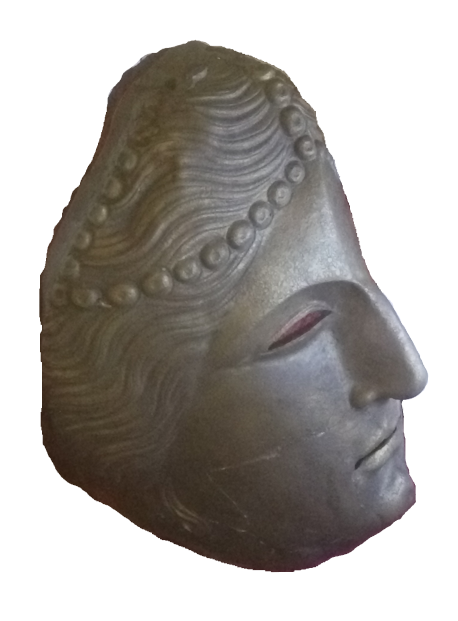

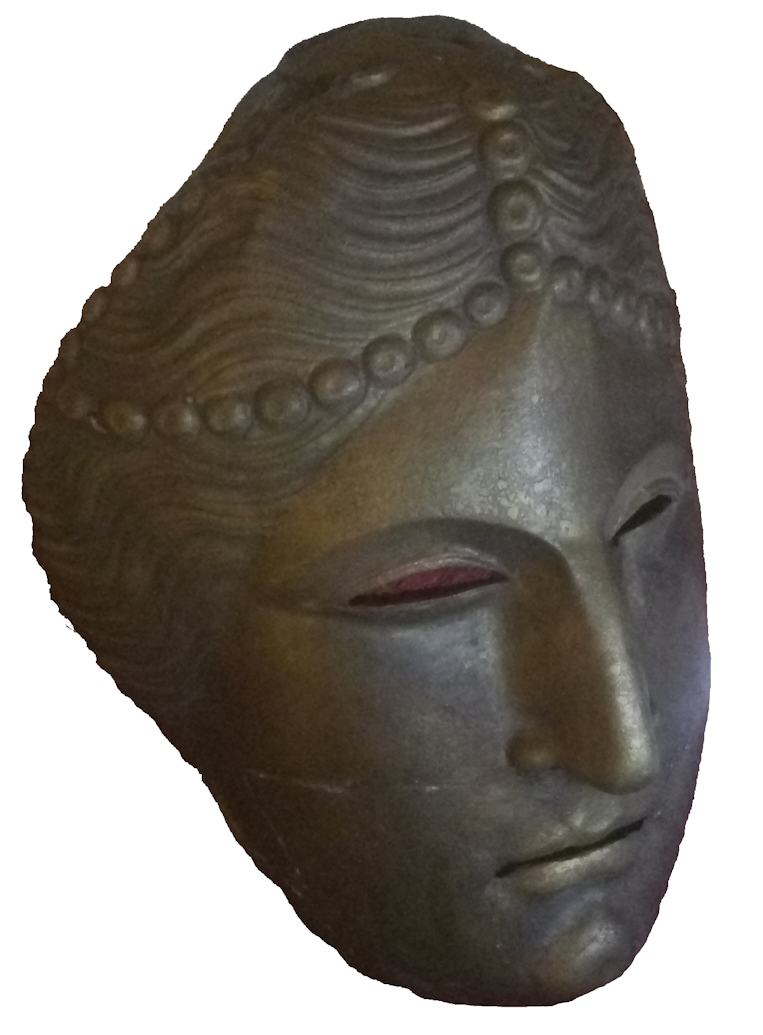

== See also ==
- List of castra
