= Titești =

- Commune
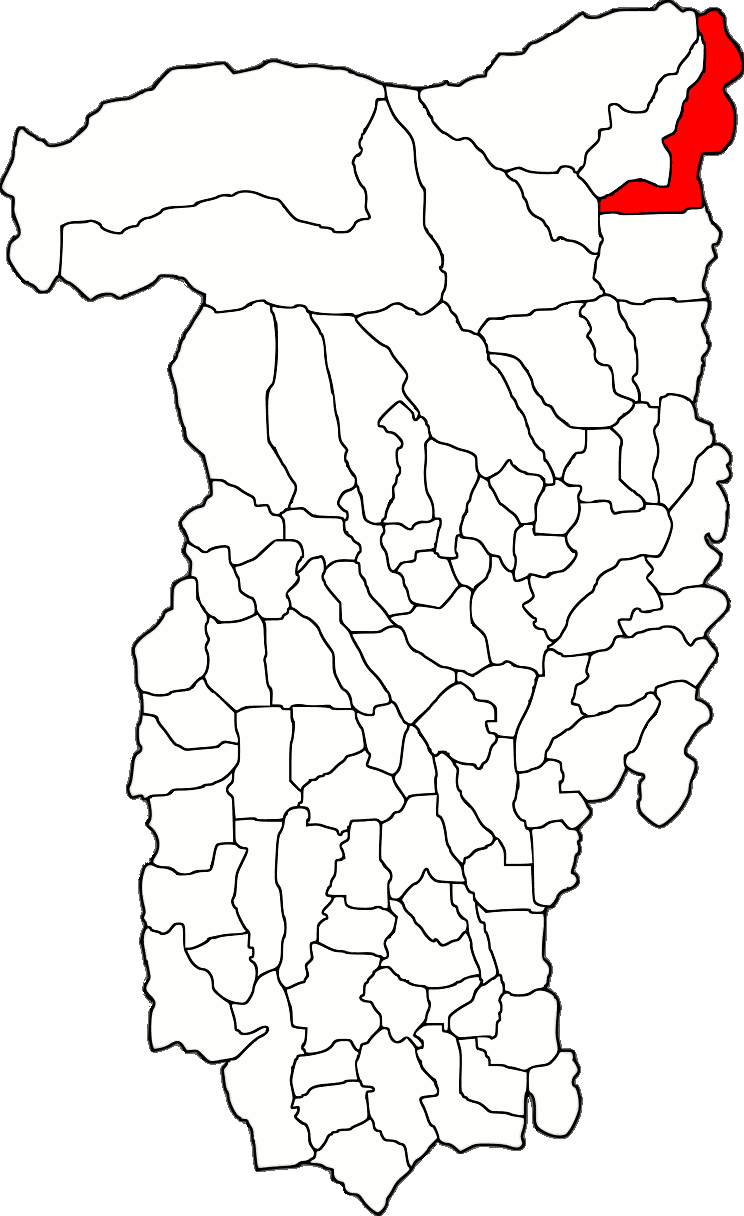
- Location in Vâlcea County

- Location in Romania
- Coordinates: 45°25′N 24°24′E
- Country: Romania
- County: Vâlcea
- Population (2021-12-01): 646
- Time zone: EET/EEST (UTC+2/+3)
- Vehicle reg.: VL

Titești is a commune located in Vâlcea County, Muntenia, Romania. It is composed of three villages: Bratovești, Cucoiu, and Titești. These were part of Perișani Commune until 2002, when they were split off to form a separate commune.

== Natives ==
- Ileana Vulpescu
