= Ionești, Vâlcea =

Ionești
- Commune
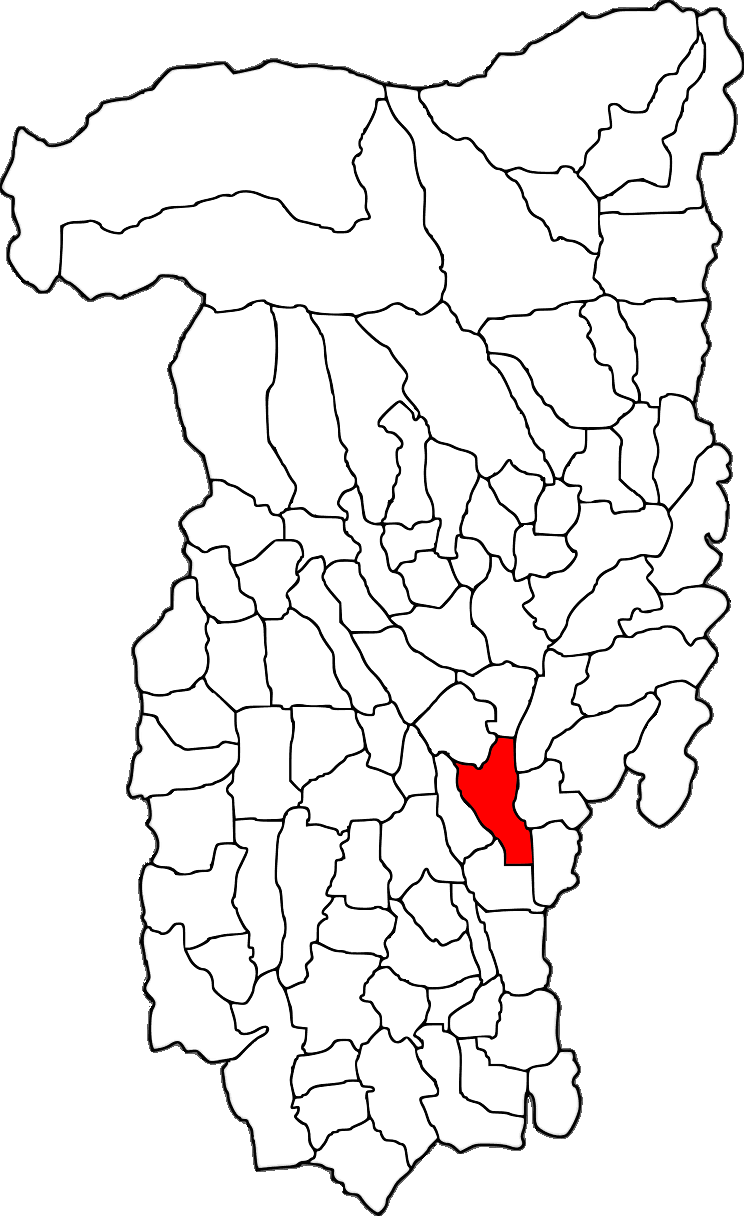
- Location in Vâlcea County

- Location in Romania
- Coordinates: 44.8803°N 24.2247°E
- Country: Romania
- County: Vâlcea
- Area: 53.74 km^{2} (20.75 sq mi)
- Population (2021-12-01): 3,762
  - Density: 70.00/km^{2} (181.3/sq mi)
- Time zone: UTC+02:00 (EET)
  - Summer (DST): UTC+03:00 (EEST)
- Vehicle reg.: VL

Ionești is a commune located in Vâlcea County, Oltenia, Romania. It is composed of nine villages: Bucșani, Dealu Mare, Delureni, Fișcălia, Fotești, Guguianca, Ionești, Marcea and Prodănești.

== See also ==
- Castra Pons Aluti
