= Călimănești =

- Town
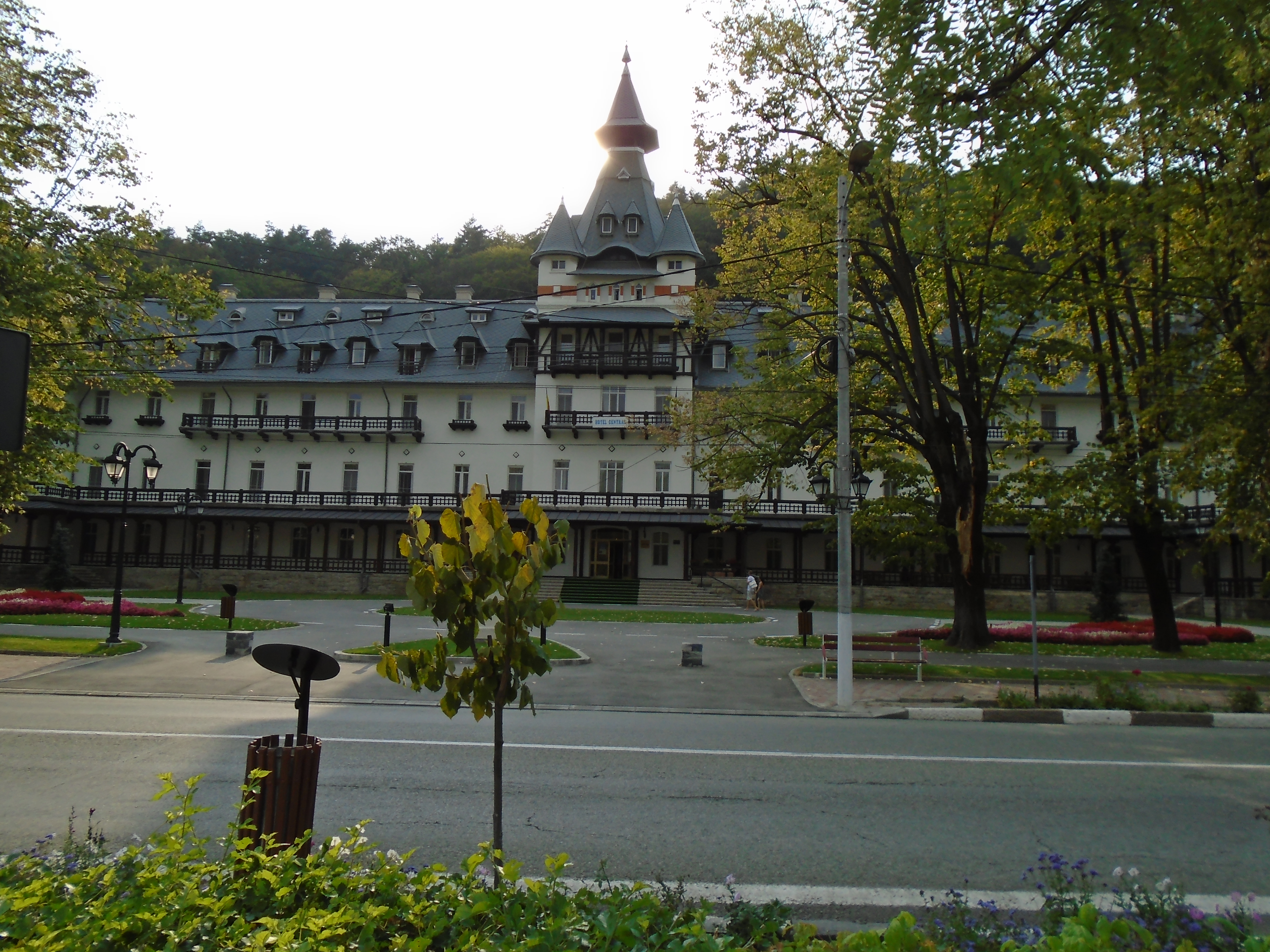

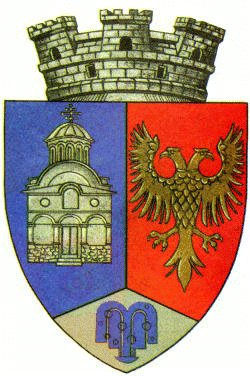
- Coat of arms

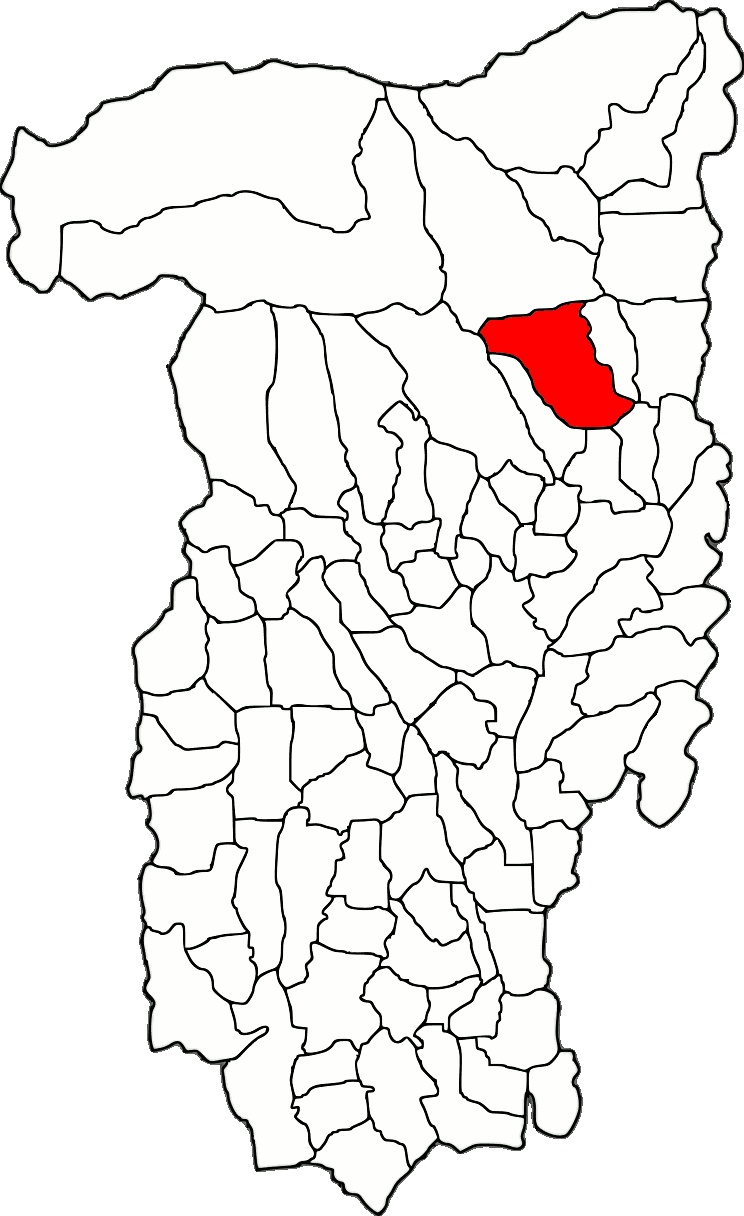
- Location in Vâlcea County

- Location in Romania
- Coordinates: 45°14′21″N 24°20′36″E
- Country: Romania
- County: Vâlcea

Government
  - Mayor (2024–2028): Florinel Constantinescu (PNL)
- Area: 104.5 km^{2} (40.3 sq mi)
- Elevation: 280 m (920 ft)
- Population (2021-12-01): 7,348
  - Density: 70.32/km^{2} (182.1/sq mi)
- Time zone: UTC+02:00 (EET)
  - Summer (DST): UTC+03:00 (EEST)
- Postal code: 245600
- Area code: (+40) 02 50
- Vehicle reg.: VL
- Website: www.primaria-calimanesti.ro

Călimănești, often known as Călimănești-Căciulata, is a town in Vâlcea County, southern Romania. It is situated in the historical region of Oltenia and the northern part of the county, on the traditional route connecting the region to Transylvania, and at the southern end of the Olt River valley crossing the Southern Carpathians.

Historical population
Year	Pop.	±%
1930	2,876	—
1948	3,329	+15.8%
1956	6,651	+99.8%
1966	6,735	+1.3%
1977	8,095	+20.2%
1992	9,131	+12.8%
2002	8,923	−2.3%
2011	7,622	−14.6%
2021	7,348	−3.6%
Source: Census data

The location of several thermal springs, Călimănești-Căciulata is known as a spa town. During the 20th century, many hotels and treatment facilities were built in Căciulata, a northern area of the town which is close to Cozia Monastery. The Monastery was built by Mircea the Elder in 1388 which is also the day of the city Călimănești and Râmnicu Vâlcea (just south on DN7). The Arutela Roman Fort is also located here.

The area around the town is full of fresh water springs and spa waters that are not in use. The old town was a bit smaller, the island you see on the Olt river was bigger and the road was located on what is now the river bed. In 1918 the town was a major point of invasion in Transylvania. The town is built along DN7, the second most used road in Romania, used by Romanians to travel across the Carpathians to Transylvania and recently also often used to go to Hungary, Austria and many other EU nations.

The town administers five villages: Căciulata, Jiblea Nouă, Jiblea Veche, Seaca and Păușa.

== Tourist attractions ==
Some of the attractions and tourist sites, as well as places to visit in the surrounding area—which offer visitors the chance to experience the region’s natural beauty and its historical and religious landmarks—include the following:

- Cozia Monastery
- The Park of the Central Hotel in Călimănești
- A.E. Baconschi City Library, historic building
- The spa trail connecting Călimănești and Căciulata
- Boat ride in Călimănești Căciulata
- Poiana lui Căliman in Căciulata
- Lotrișor Waterfall
- The Arutela Roman Castrum
- Berislăvești Monastery
- Căciulata Park
- COZIA AquaPark in Căciulata
- Turnu Monastery
- Stânișoara Monastery
- Cozia National Park

== Gallery ==
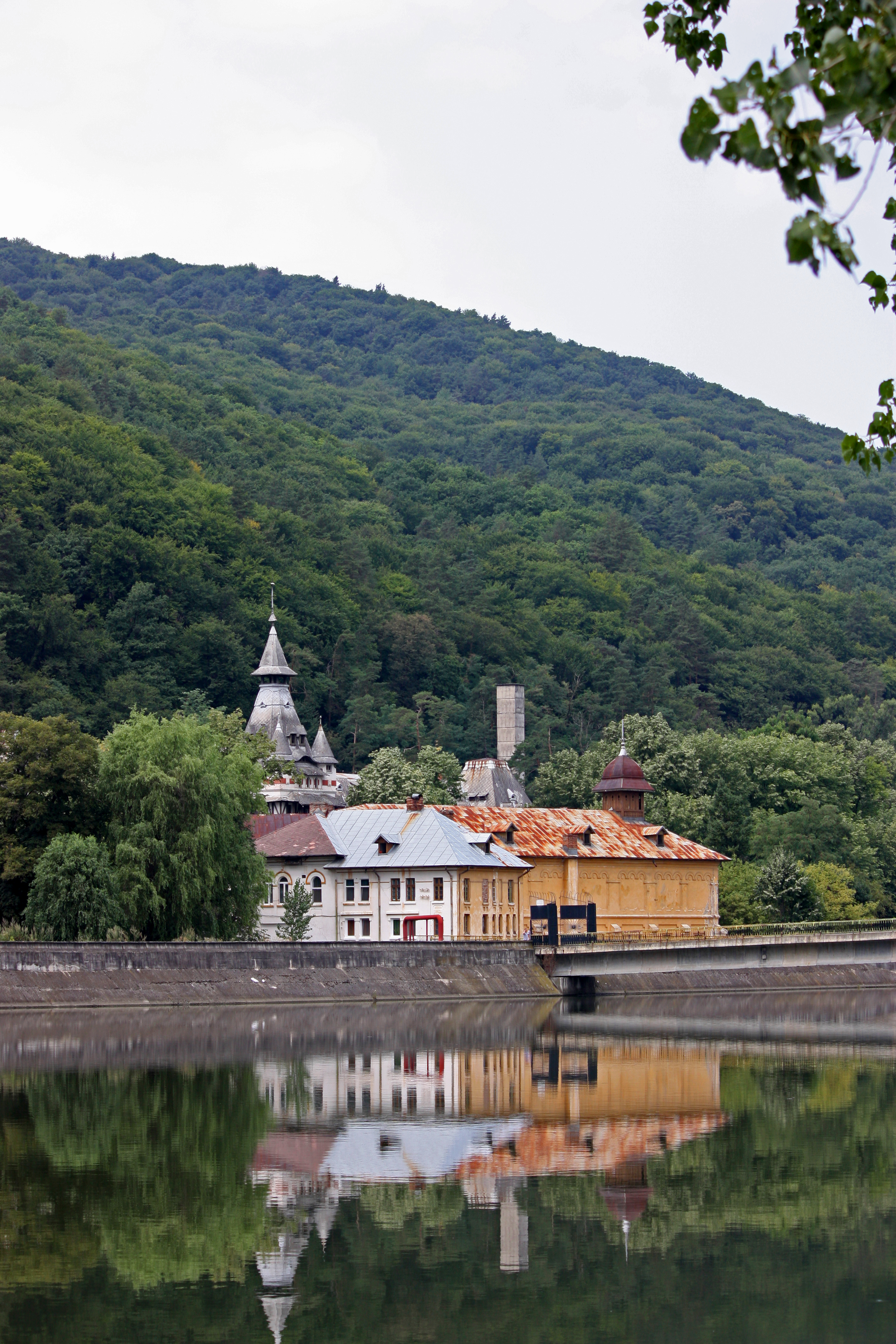
Central Pavilion

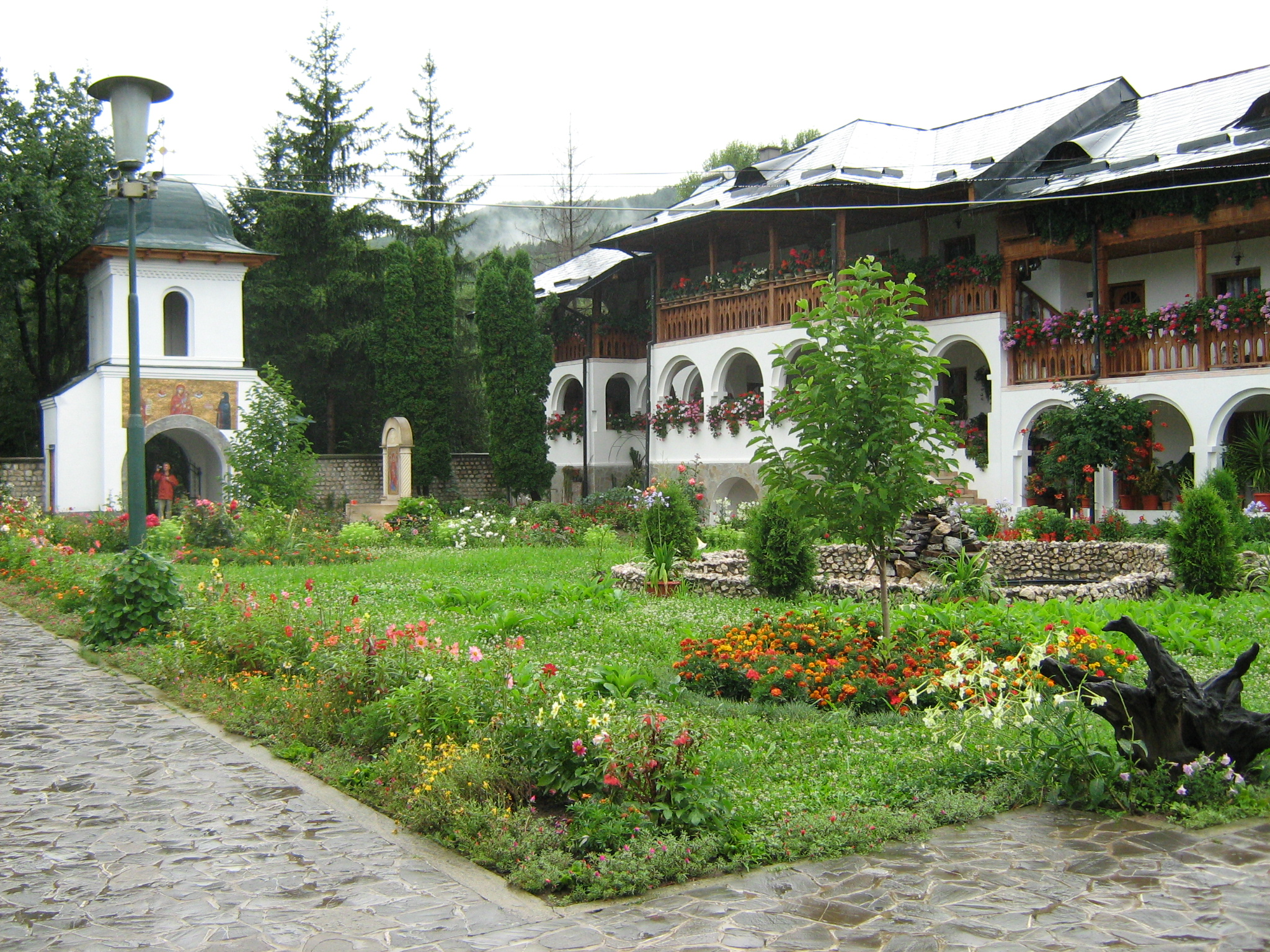
Ostrov Monastery

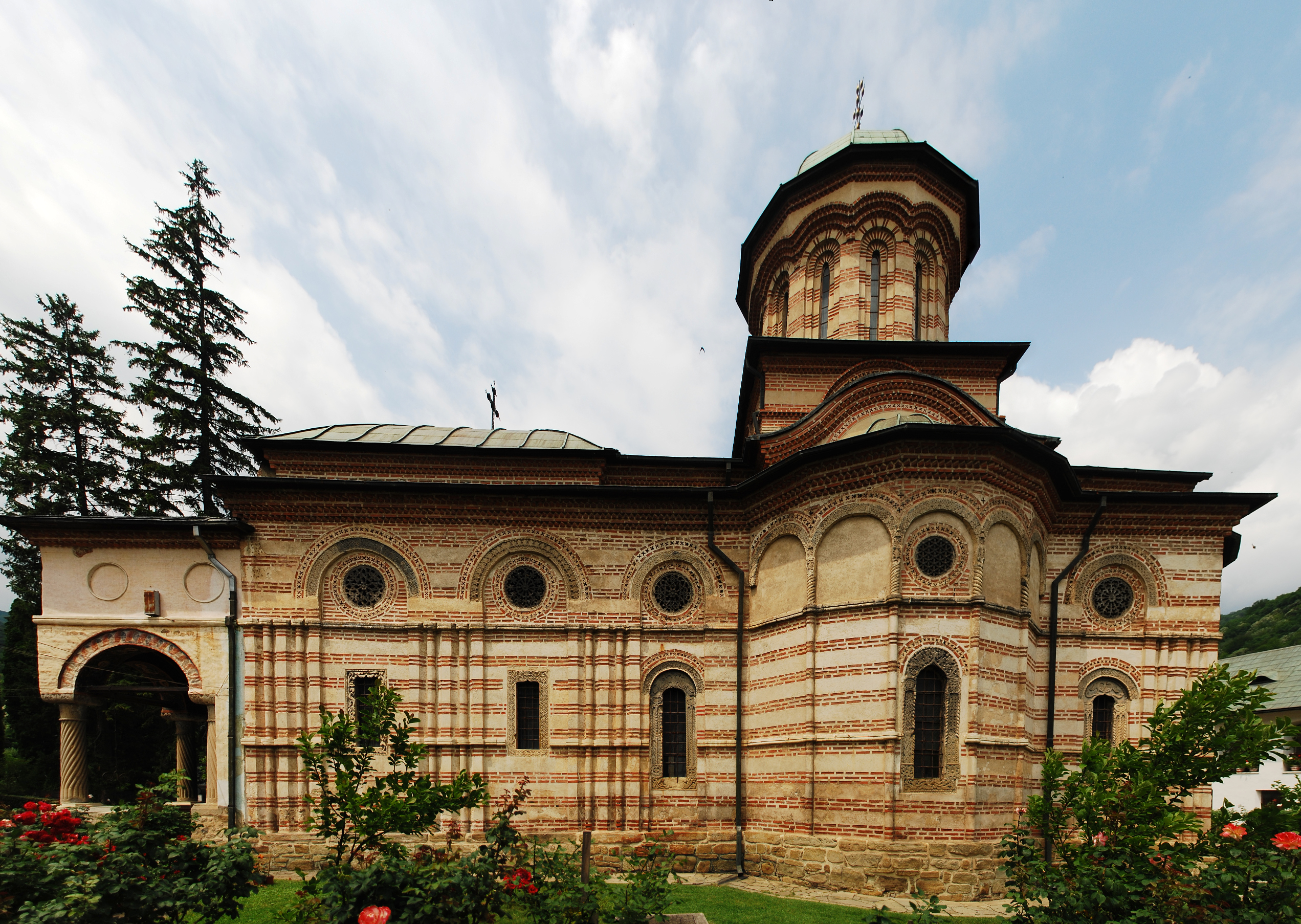
Holy Trinity Church of the Cozia Monastery

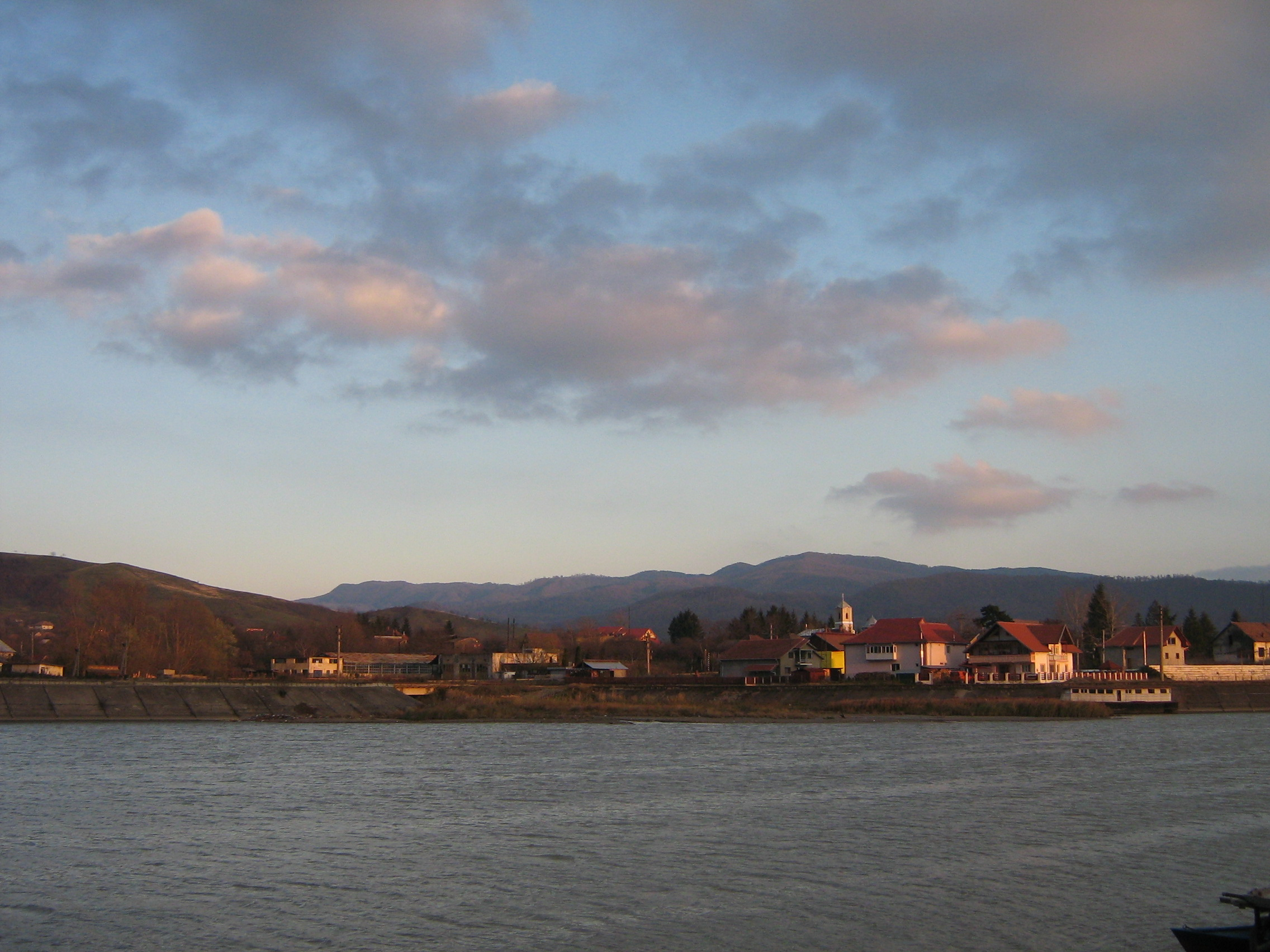
Olt River

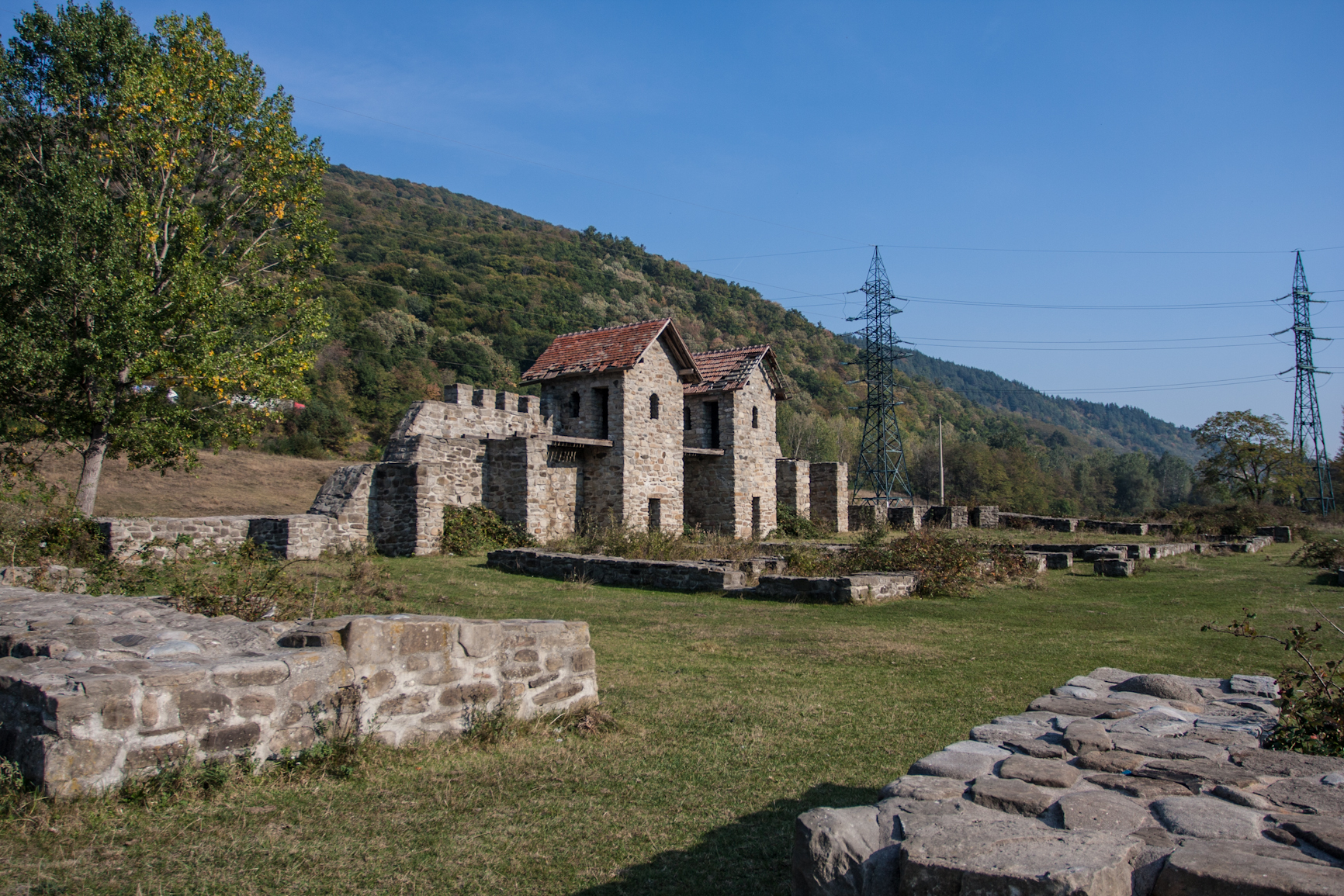
The Arutela Roman Castrum

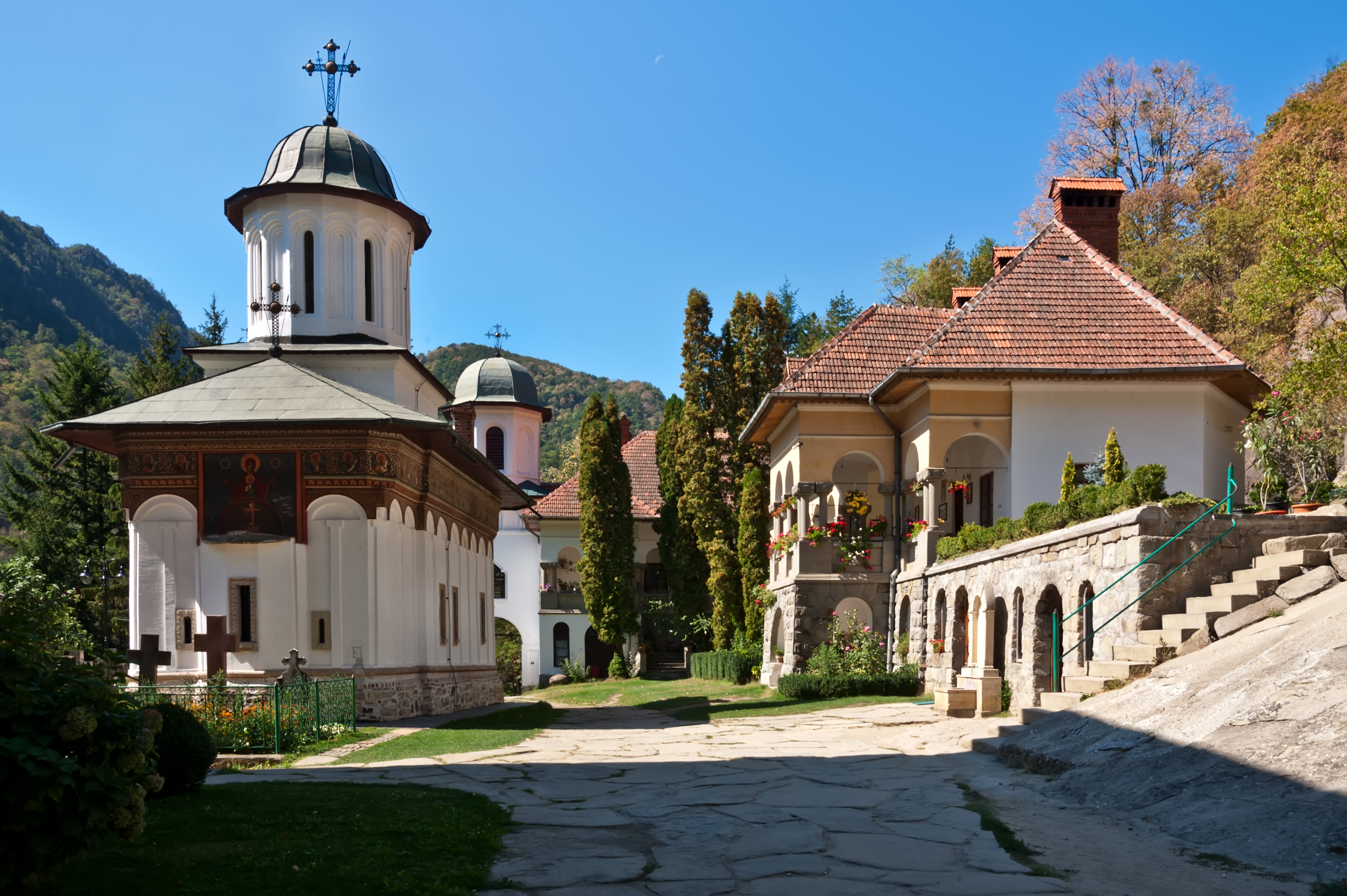
Turnu Monastery

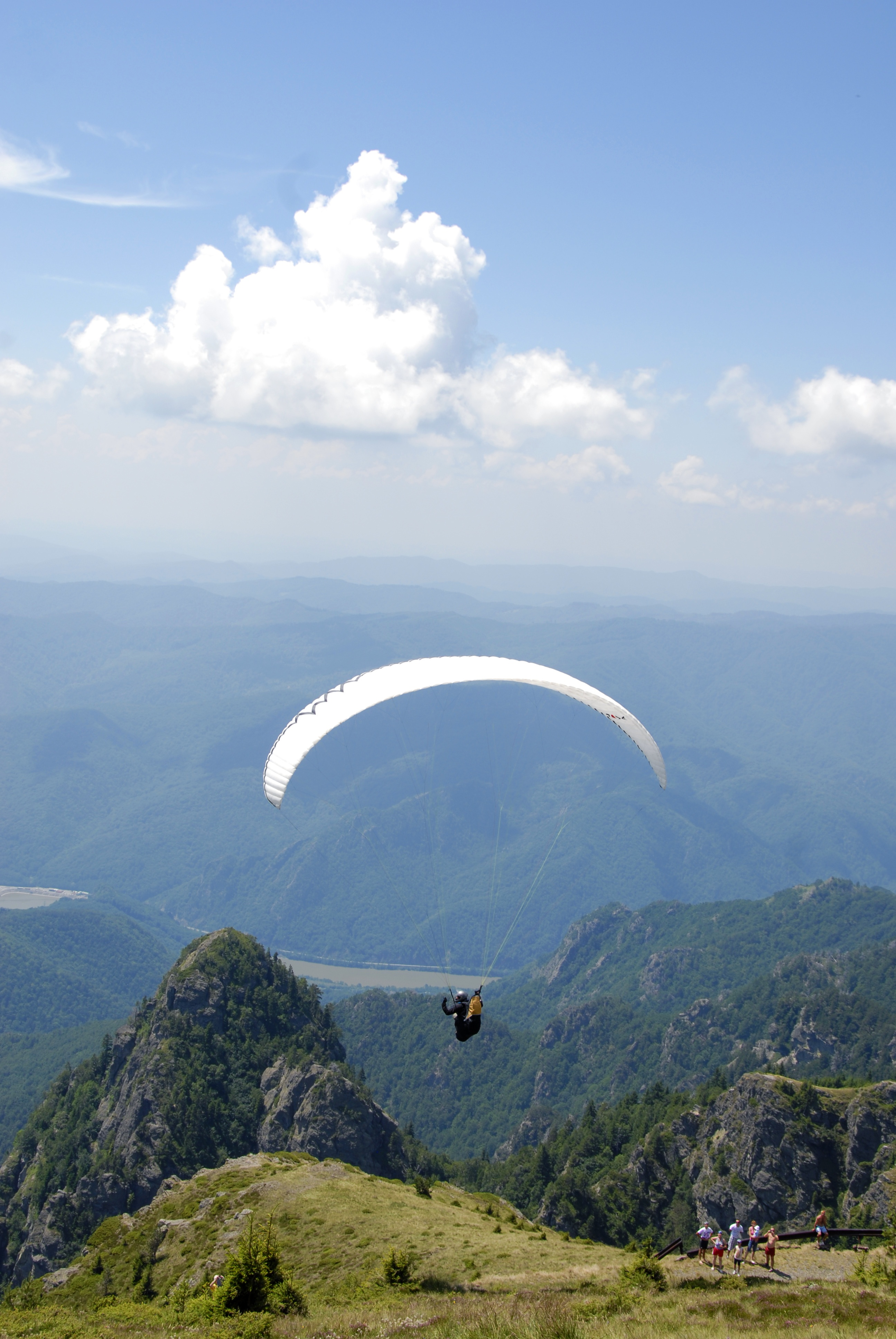
Cozia National Park

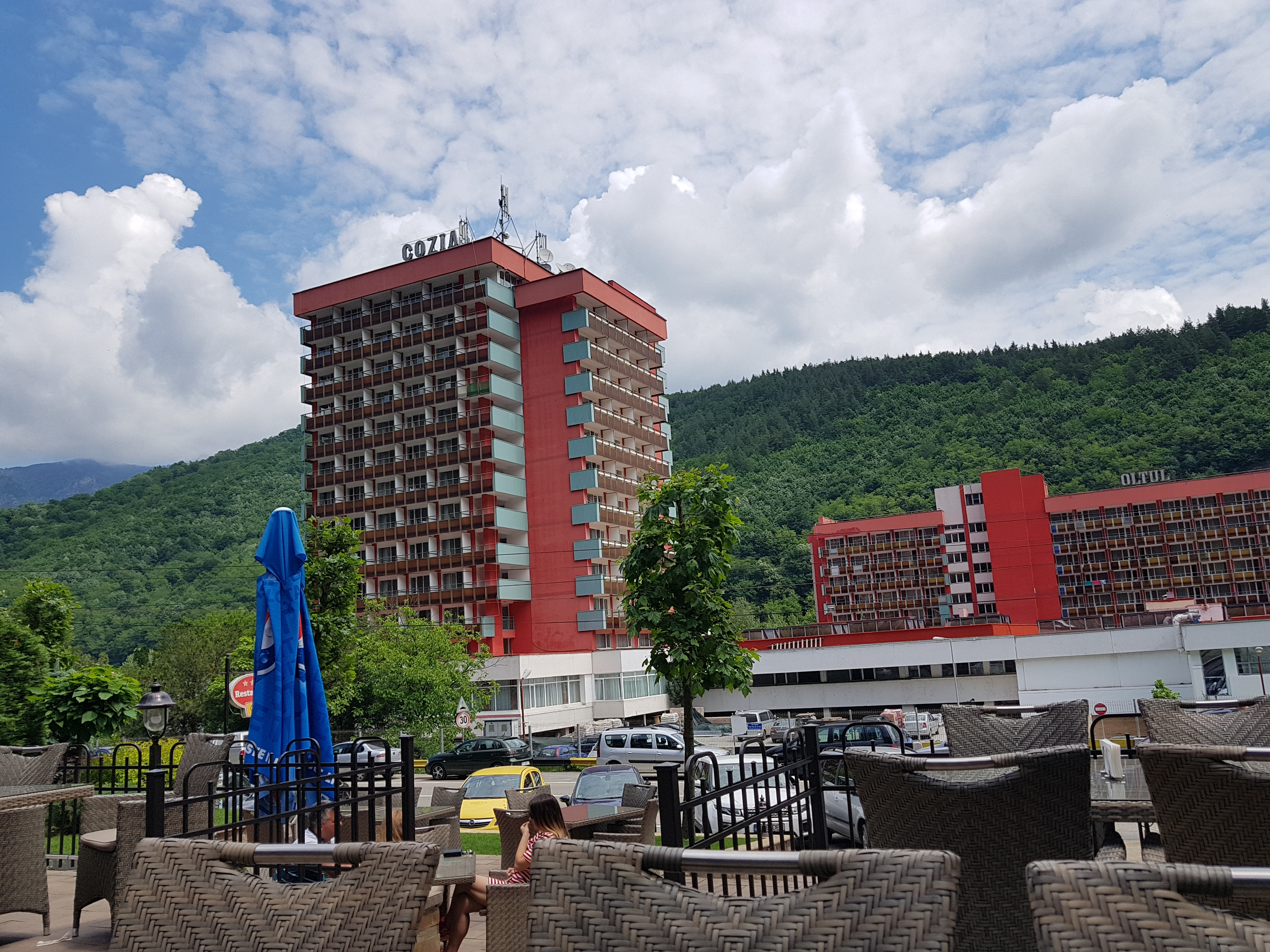
Călimănești

== Notable people ==
- Adrian Dulcea (born 1978), football player and coach
- Ion Duminicel (born 1954), bobsledder
- Nicolae Rădescu (1874–1953), lieutenant general and last Prime Minister of Romania before communist rule
- Florin Zamfirescu (born 1949), theater and film actor and director
