= Pons Aluti (castra) =

- Castra of Ionești; Castra of Ioneștii Govorei
- Location within Romania
- 44°52′N 24°13′E
- Location: Ionești, Vâlcea, Romania

History
- Founded: 2nd century AD
- Built: Trajan

Site notes
- Condition: Ruined

Pons Aluti was a fort in the Roman province of Dacia.

== See also ==
- List of castra
