= Racovița, Vâlcea =

Racovița
- Commune
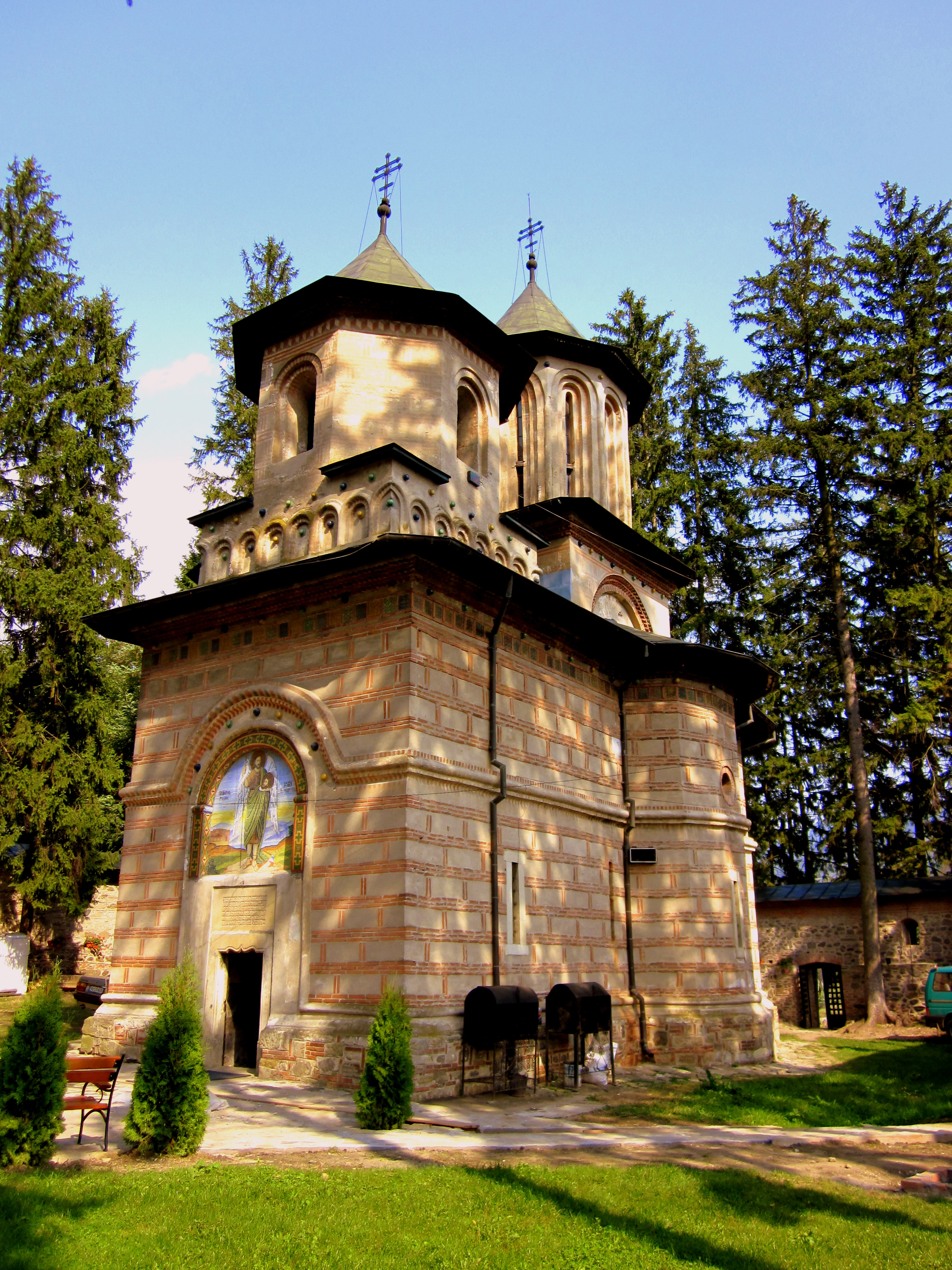
- Cornet Monastery in Tuțulești

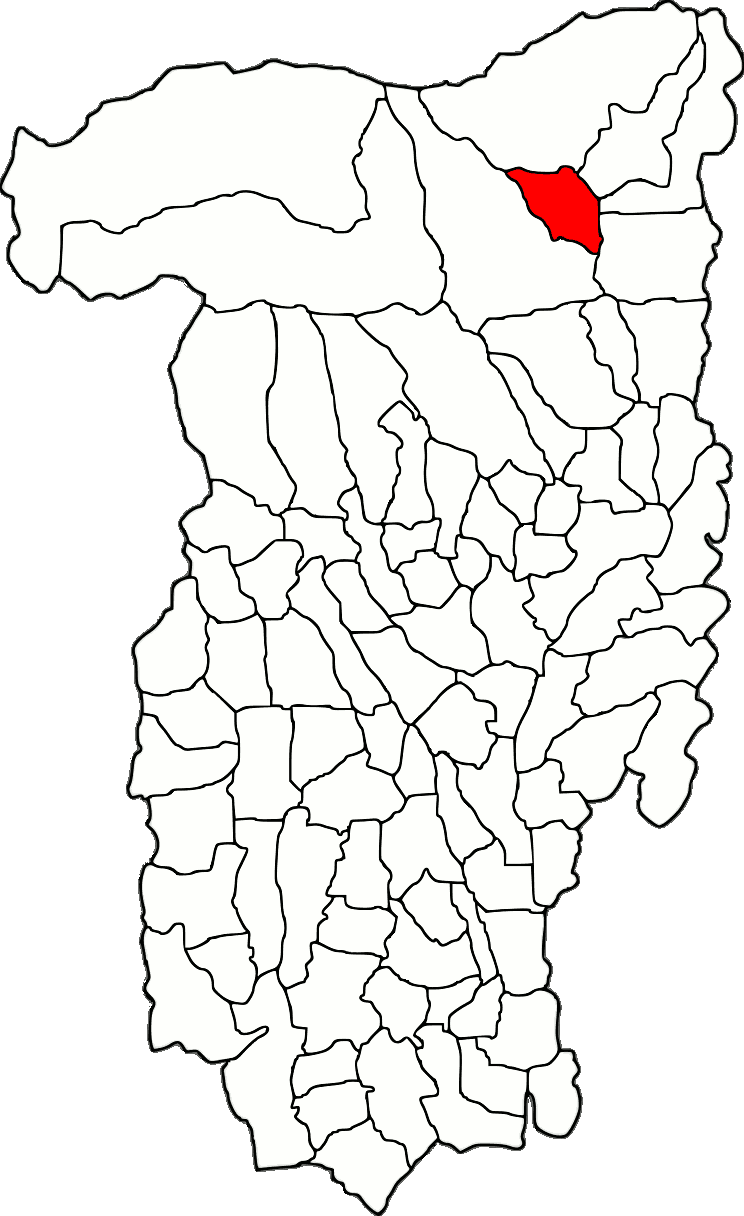
- Location in Vâlcea County

- Location in Romania
- Coordinates: 45°25′N 24°19′E
- Country: Romania
- County: Vâlcea

Government
  - Mayor (2020–2024): Ion-Narcis Iliescu (PSD)
- Area: 58.36 km^{2} (22.53 sq mi)
- Elevation: 338 m (1,109 ft)
- Population (2021-12-01): 1,684
  - Density: 28.86/km^{2} (74.74/sq mi)
- Time zone: UTC+02:00 (EET)
  - Summer (DST): UTC+03:00 (EEST)
- Postal code: 247062
- Area code: +(40) 250
- Vehicle reg.: VL
- Website: primaria-racovita.ro

Racovița is a commune located in Vâlcea County, Muntenia, Romania. It is composed of seven villages: Balota, Blănoiu, Bradu-Clocotici, Copăceni, Gruiu Lupului, Racovița, and Tuțulești.

The commune is situated in the foothills of the Southern Carpathians, at altitude of 338 m (1,109 ft). It lies on the banks of the Olt River and its left tributary, the Pârâul Sec.

Racovița is the site of two ancient Roman forts, Praetorium (Racovița) and Praetorium (castra of Copăceni).
