= Perișani =

- Commune
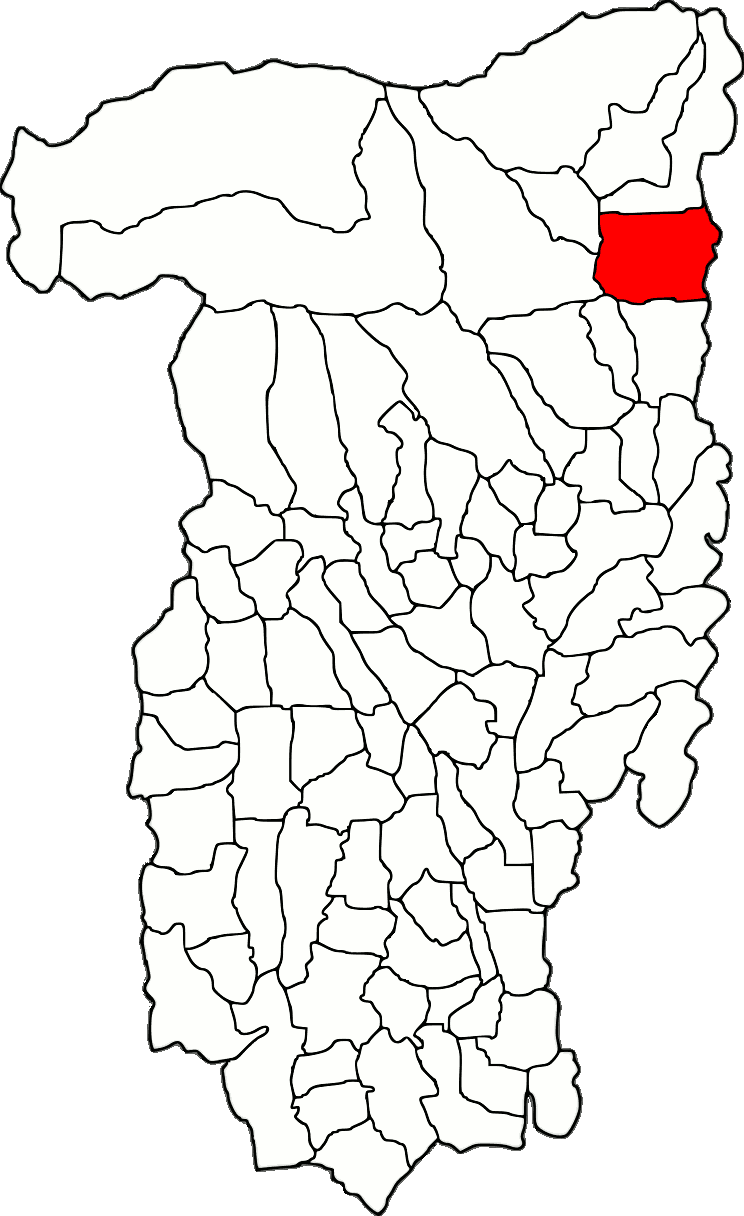
- Location in Vâlcea County

- Location in Romania
- Coordinates: 45°23′N 24°24′E
- Country: Romania
- County: Vâlcea
- Area: 157.83 km^{2} (60.94 sq mi)
- Population (2021-12-01): 1,844
  - Density: 11.68/km^{2} (30.26/sq mi)
- Time zone: UTC+02:00 (EET)
  - Summer (DST): UTC+03:00 (EEST)
- Vehicle reg.: VL

Perișani is a commune located in Vâlcea County, Muntenia, Romania. It is composed of eight villages: Băiașu, Mlăceni, Perișani, Podeni, Poiana, Pripoare, Spinu and Surdoiu. It also included Bratovești, Cucoiu and Titești villages until 2002, when these were split off to form Titești Commune.
