= Dăești =

- Commune
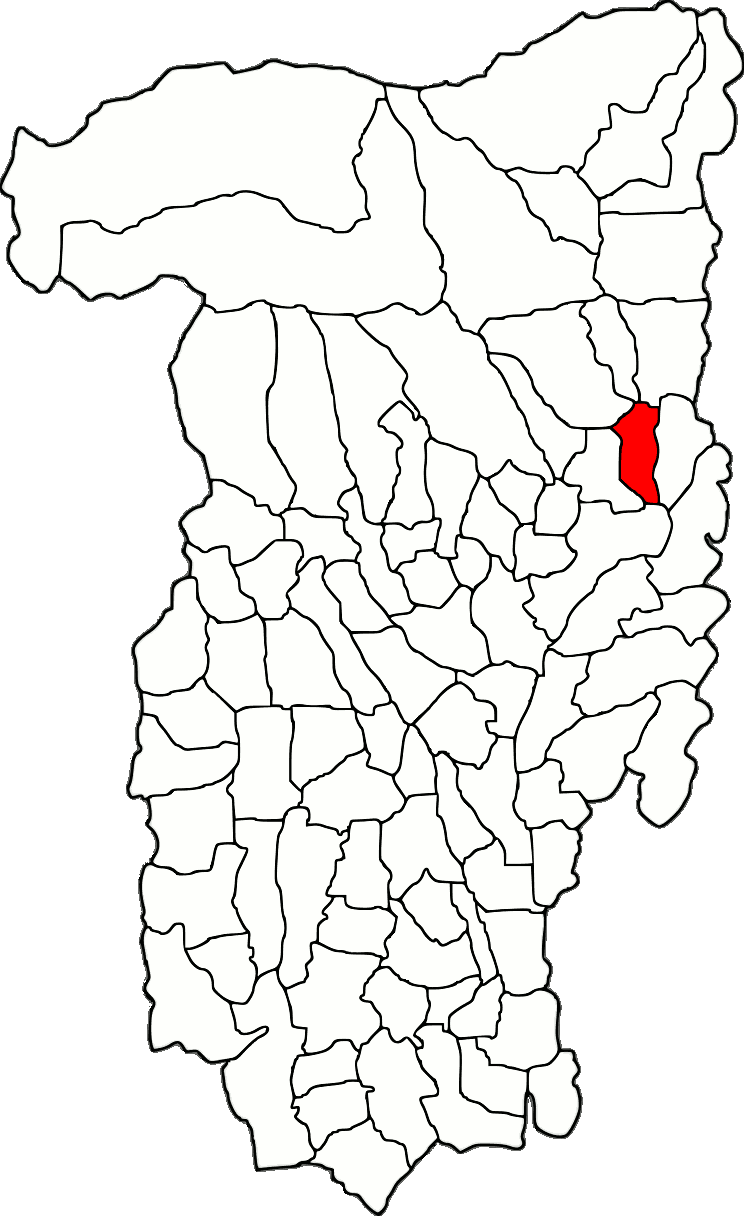
- Location in Vâlcea County

- Location in Romania
- Coordinates: 45°12′N 24°23′E
- Country: Romania
- County: Vâlcea
- Area: 30.29 km^{2} (11.70 sq mi)
- Population (2021-12-01): 2,966
  - Density: 97.92/km^{2} (253.6/sq mi)
- Time zone: UTC+02:00 (EET)
  - Summer (DST): UTC+03:00 (EEST)
- Vehicle reg.: VL

Dăești is a commune in Vâlcea County, Muntenia, Romania. It is composed of four villages: Băbuești, Dăești, Fedeleșoiu, and Sânbotin.

Nearby was the Roman fort of Castra Traiana.
